= Interosseous artery =

Interosseous artery may refer to

- Anterior interosseous artery
- Common interosseous artery
- Interosseous recurrent artery
- Posterior interosseous artery
