= Arm =

Proximal part of the free upper limb between the shoulder and the elbow

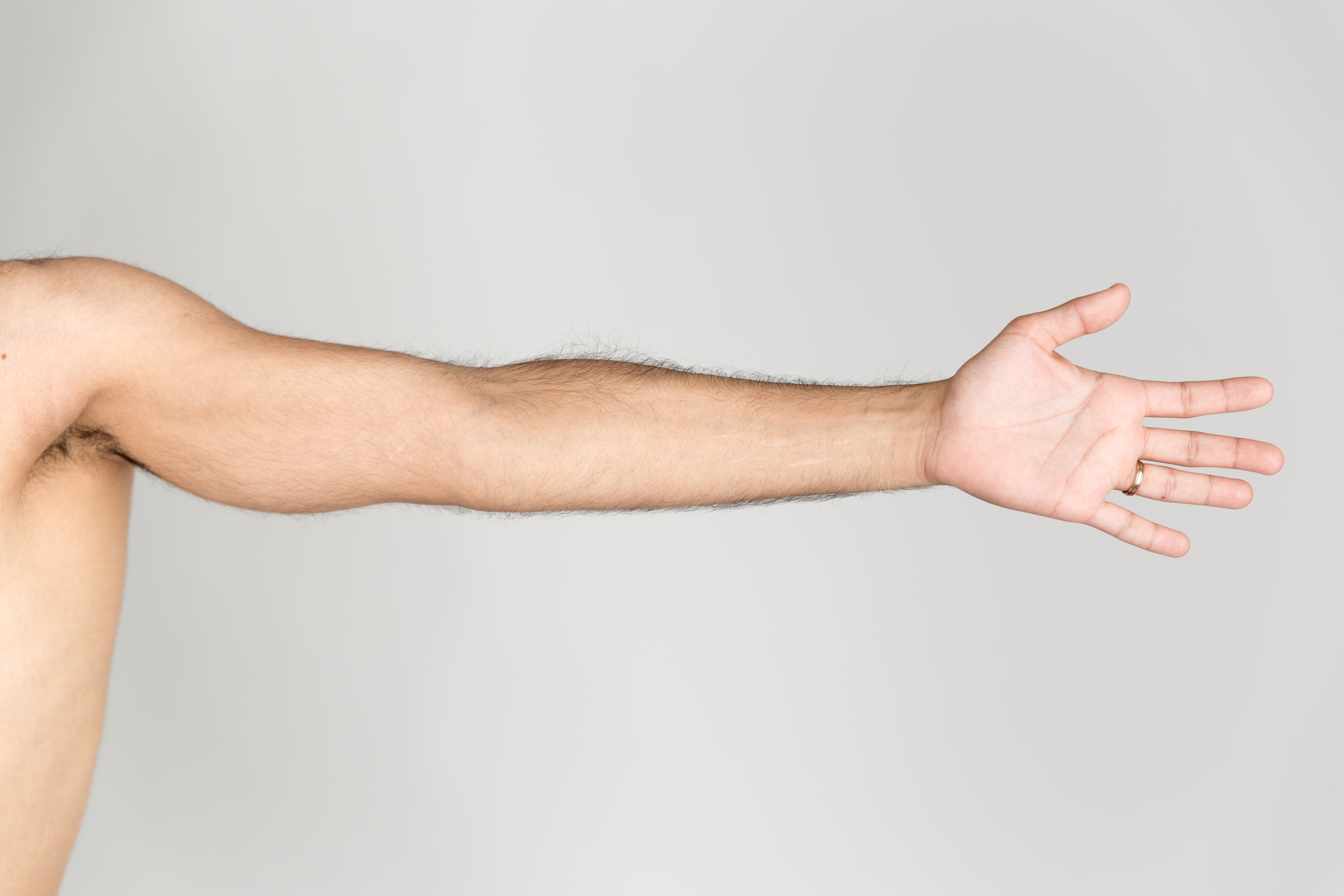
- The left arm of a human male

Details
- Artery: Axillary artery
- Vein: Axillary vein
- Nerve: Brachial plexus

Identifiers
- Latin: brachium

In human anatomy, the arm refers to the upper limb in common usage, although academically the term specifically means the upper arm between the glenohumeral joint (shoulder joint) and the elbow joint. The distal part of the upper arm between the elbow and the radiocarpal joint (wrist joint) is known as the forearm or "lower" arm, and the extremity beyond the wrist is the hand.

By anatomical definitions, the bones, ligaments and skeletal muscles of the shoulder girdle, as well as the axilla between them, are considered parts of the upper limb, and thus also components of the arm. The Latin term brachium, which serves as a root word for naming many anatomical structures, may refer to either the upper arm as a whole or to the upper arm on its own.

== Structure ==
=== Bones ===
Bones of the upper limbs, together with shoulder girdles, that compose the human arm.

The humerus is one of the three long bones of the arm. It joins with the scapula at the shoulder joint and with the other long bones of the arm, the ulna and radius at the elbow joint. The elbow is a complex hinge joint between the end of the humerus and the ends of the radius and ulna.

=== Muscles ===
The arm is divided by a fascial layer (known as lateral and medial intermuscular septa) separating the muscles into two osteofascial compartments: the anterior and the posterior compartments of the arm. The fascia merges with the periosteum (outer bone layer) of the humerus.

The anterior compartment contains three muscles: biceps brachii, brachialis and coracobrachialis muscles. They are all innervated by the musculocutaneous nerve. The posterior compartment contains only the triceps brachii muscle, supplied by the radial nerve.

=== Nerve supply ===
Cutaneous innervation of the right upper extremity.

The musculocutaneous nerve, from C5, C6, C7, is the main supplier of muscles of the anterior compartment. It originates from the lateral cord of the brachial plexus of nerves. It pierces the coracobrachialis muscle and gives off branches to the muscle, as well as to brachialis and biceps brachii. It terminates as the anterior cutaneous nerve of the forearm.

The radial nerve, which is from the fifth cervical spinal nerve to the first thoracic spinal nerve, originates as the continuation of the posterior cord of the brachial plexus. This nerve enters the lower triangular space (an imaginary space bounded by, amongst others, the shaft of the humerus and the triceps brachii) of the arm and lies deep to the triceps brachii. Here it travels with the deep artery of the arm, which sits in the radial groove of the humerus. This fact is very important clinically as a fracture of the shaft of the bone here can cause lesions or even transections in the nerve.

Other nerves passing through give no supply to the arm. These include:

- The median nerve, nerve origin C5-T1, which is a branch of the lateral and medial cords of the brachial plexus. This nerve continues in the arm, travelling in a plane between the biceps and triceps muscles. At the cubital fossa, this nerve is deep to the pronator teres muscle and is the most medial structure in the fossa. The nerve passes into the forearm.
- The ulnar nerve, origin C8-T1, is a continuation of the medial cord of the brachial plexus. This nerve passes in the same plane as the median nerve, between the biceps and triceps muscles. At the elbow, this nerve travels posterior to the medial epicondyle of the humerus. This means that condylar fractures can cause lesion to this nerve.

=== Blood supply ===
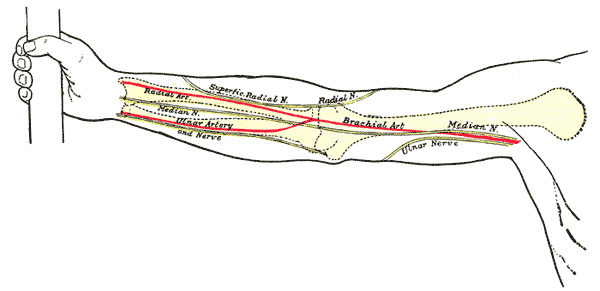
Main arteries of the arm.

The main artery in the arm is the brachial artery. This artery is a big continuation of the axillary artery. The point at which the axillary becomes the brachial is distal to the lower border of teres major. The brachial artery gives off an unimportant branch, the deep artery of arm. This branching occurs just below the lower border of teres major.

The brachial artery continues to the cubital fossa in the anterior compartment of the arm. It travels in a plane between the biceps and triceps muscles, the same as the median nerve and basilic vein. It is accompanied by venae comitantes (accompanying veins). It gives branches to the muscles of the anterior compartment. The artery is in between the median nerve and the tendon of the biceps muscle in the cubital fossa. It then continues into the forearm.

The deep artery of the arm travels through the lower triangular space with the radial nerve. From here onwards it has an intimate relationship with the radial nerve. They are both found deep to the triceps muscle and are located on the spiral groove of the humerus. Therefore, fracture of the bone may not only lead to lesion of the radial nerve, but also haematoma of the internal structures of the arm. The artery then continues on to anastamose with the recurrent radial branch of the brachial artery, providing a diffuse blood supply for the elbow joint.

=== Veins ===
The veins of the arm carry blood from the extremities of the limb, as well as drain the arm itself. The two main veins are the basilic and the cephalic veins. There is a connecting vein between the two, the median cubital vein, which passes through the cubital fossa and is clinically important for venepuncture (withdrawing blood).

The basilic vein travels on the medial side of the arm and terminates at the level of the seventh rib.

The cephalic vein travels on the lateral side of the arm and terminates as the axillary vein. It passes through the deltopectoral triangle, a space between the deltoid and the pectoralis major muscles.

== Society and culture ==
In Hindu, Buddhist and Egyptian iconography the symbol of the arm is used to illustrate the power of the sovereign. In Hindu tradition gods are depicted with several arms which carry specific symbols of their powers. It is believed that several arms depict omnipotence of gods. In popular culture Thakur did not have arms in the movie Sholay.

In West Africa, the Bambara use forearm to symbolize the spirit, which is a link between God and man.

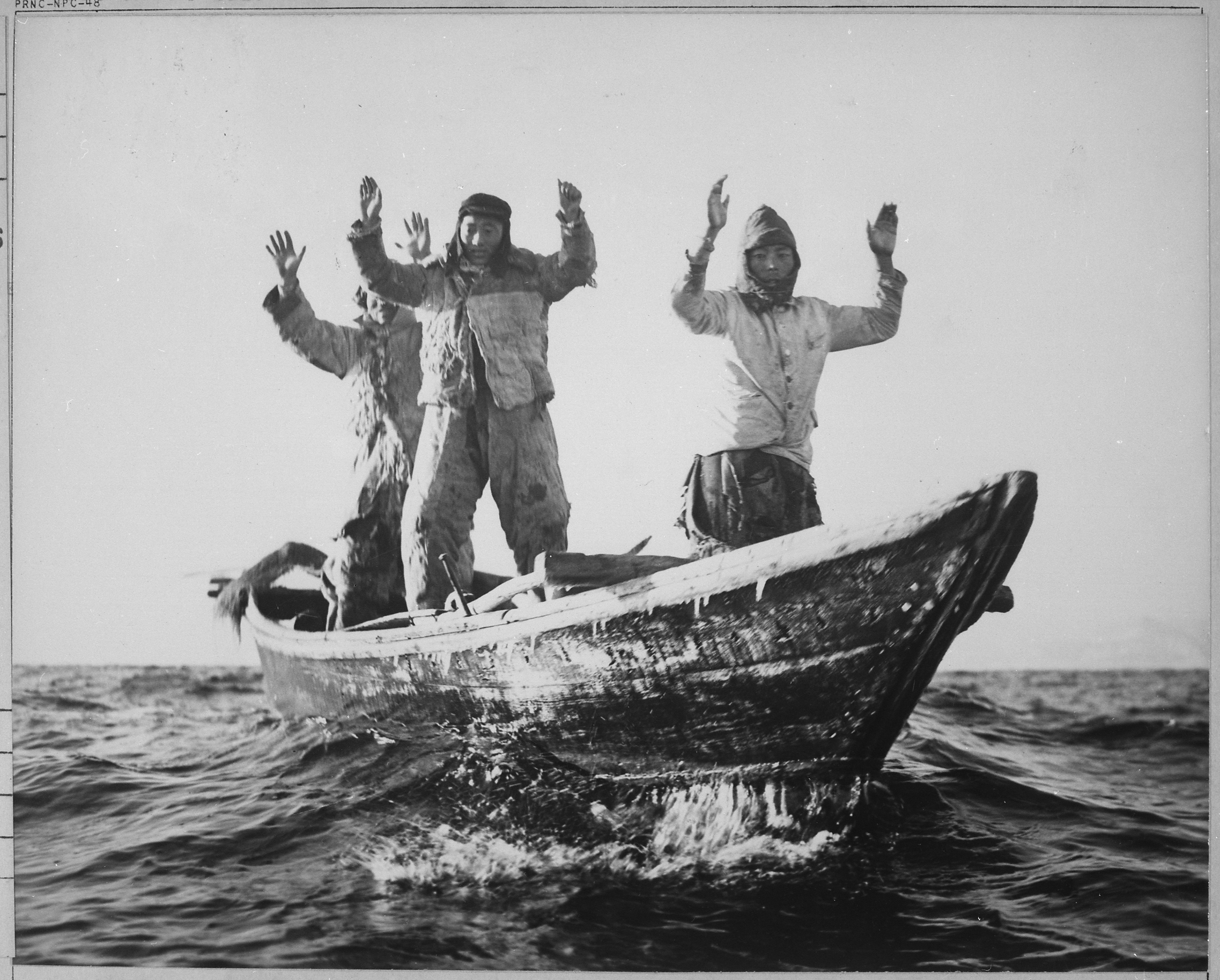
Three North Koreans surrender to USS Manchester by raising their arms

Symbolic gestures of raising both hands signal surrender, appeals for mercy, and justice.

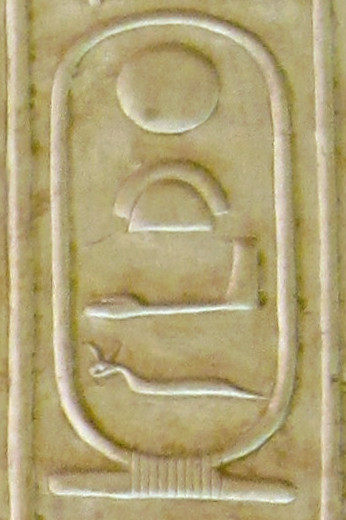
The arm, as can be seen here, formed one component of hieroglyphs

== Clinical significance ==
The cubital fossa is clinically important for venepuncture and for blood pressure measurement.

When the arm is fractured this may refer to a fracture of the humerus bone.

Veins on the arm may be taken when a coronary artery bypass graft is needed.

== Other animals ==
In other animals, the term arm can also be used for homologous or analogous structures (such as one of the paired forelimbs of a four-legged animal or the arms of cephalopods, respectively). In anatomical usage, the term arm may sometimes refer specifically to the segment between the shoulder and the elbow, while the segment between the elbow and wrist is the forearm. However, in common, literary, and historical usage, arm refers to the entire upper arm from shoulder to wrist. This article uses the former definition; see upper limb for the wider definition.

In primates, the arm is adapted for precise positioning of the hand and thus assist in the hand's manipulative tasks. The ball and socket shoulder joint allows for movement of the arms in a wide circular plane, while the structure of the two forearm bones which can rotate around each other allows for additional range of motion at that level.

== Additional images ==
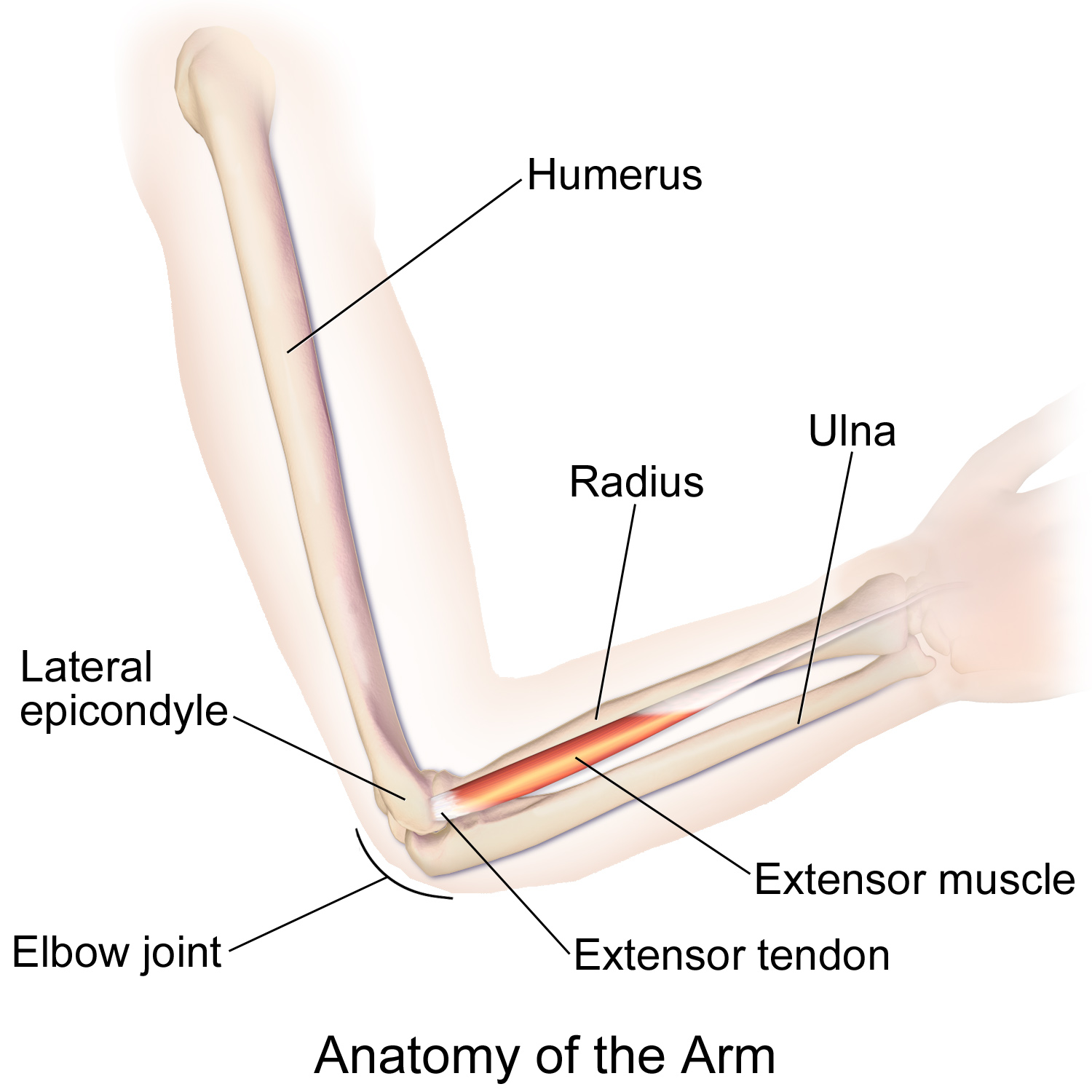
Gross anatomy of the upper arm and elbow.

== See also ==
- Axilla – also known as armpit, underarm or oxter
- Common flexor tendon
