= Posterior interosseous artery =

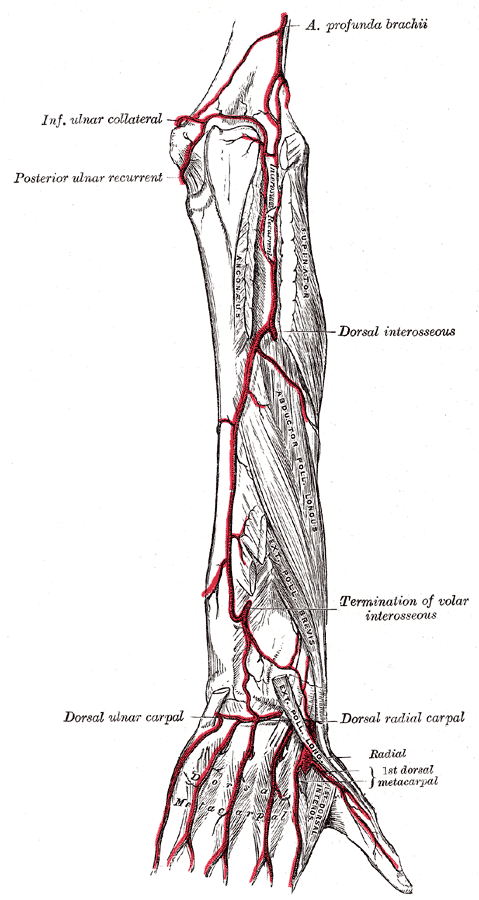
- Arteries of the back of the forearm and hand. (Dorsal interosseus labeled at center right.)

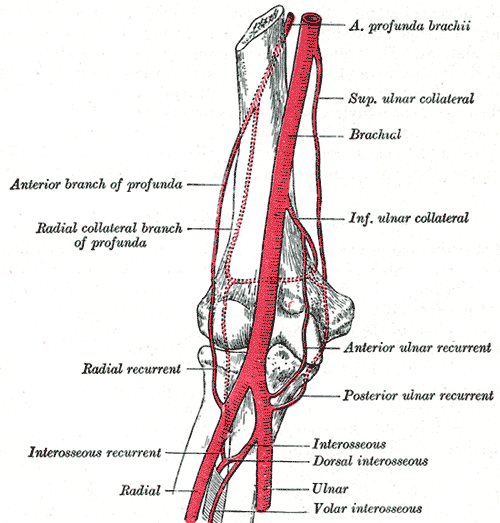
- The Supinator. (Dorsal interosseus art. labeled at center right.)

Details
- Source: Common interosseous artery
- Branches: Interosseous recurrent artery
- Supplies: Extensor digiti minimi, extensor pollicis longus, extensor pollicis brevis, extensor digitorum, extensor indicis, abductor pollicis longus

Identifiers
- Latin: arteria interossea posterior
- TA98: A12.2.09.050
- TA2: 4665
- FMA: 22811

The posterior interosseous artery (dorsal interosseous artery) is an artery of the forearm. It is a branch of the common interosseous artery, which is a branch of the ulnar artery.

== Structure ==
The posterior interosseous artery passes backward between the oblique cord and the upper border of the interosseous membrane. It appears between the contiguous borders of supinator muscle and the abductor pollicis longus muscle, and runs down the back of the forearm between the superficial and deep layers of muscles, to both of which it distributes branches.

Where it lies on abductor pollicis longus muscle and the extensor pollicis brevis muscle, it is accompanied by the dorsal interosseous nerve. At the lower part of the forearm it anastomoses with the termination of the volar interosseous artery, and with the dorsal carpal network.

=== Branches ===
Near its origin, it gives off the interosseous recurrent artery. This ascends to the interval between the lateral epicondyle and olecranon, on or through the fibers of supinator muscle, but beneath the anconeus muscle, and anastomoses with the middle collateral branch of the deep artery of arm, the posterior ulnar recurrent artery and the inferior ulnar collateral artery.

The posterior interosseous artery gives off many muscular arteries.

== Additional images ==
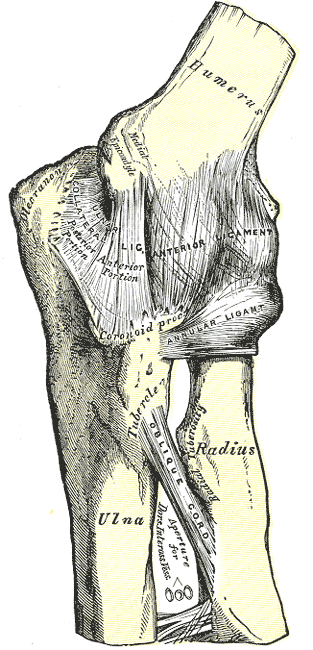
Left elbow-joint, showing anterior and ulnar collateral ligaments.

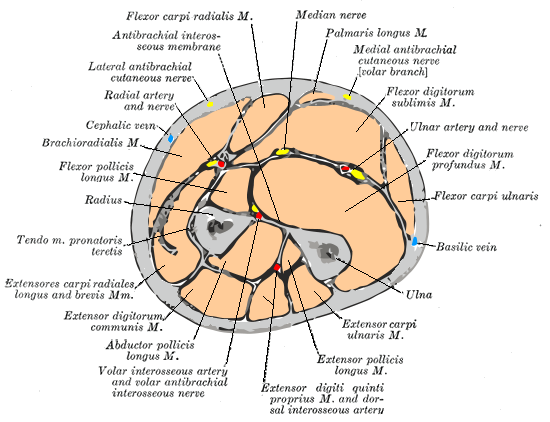
Cross-section through the middle of the forearm.

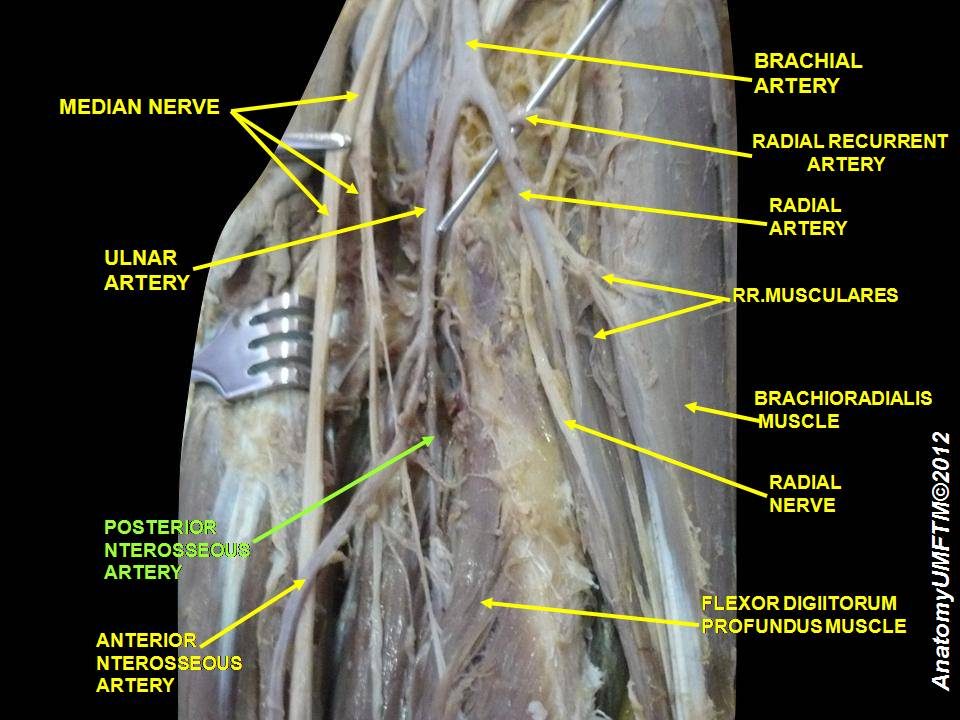
Posterior interosseous artery

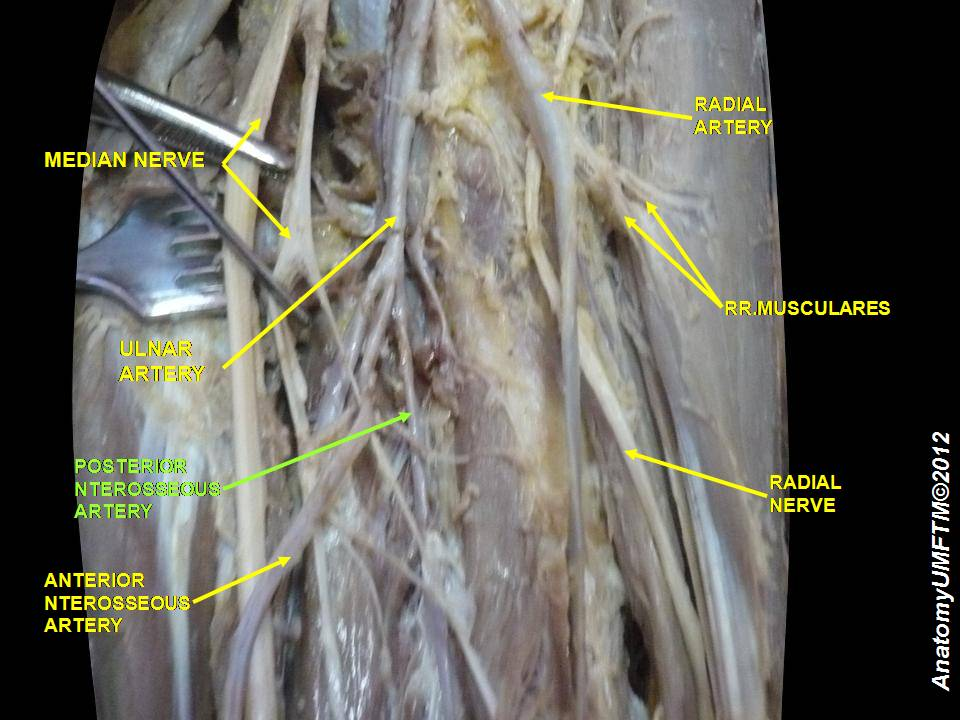
Posterior interosseous artery

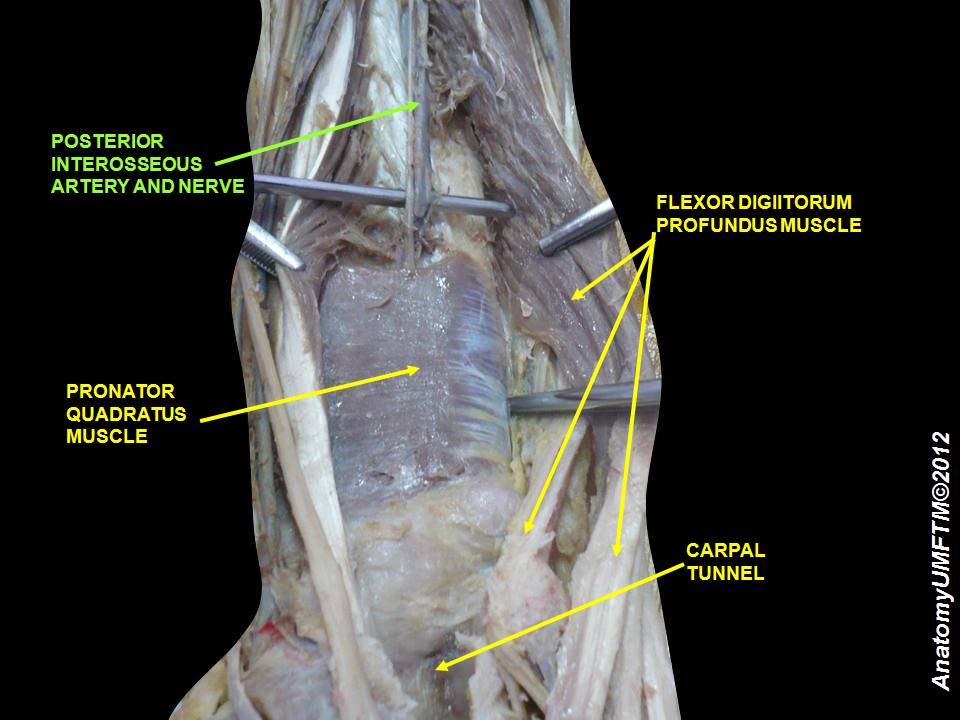
Posterior interosseous artery and nerve

== See also ==
- Anterior interosseous artery
- Ulnar artery
