= Collateral artery =

Collateral artery may refer to:

- Inferior ulnar collateral artery
- Major aortopulmonary collateral artery
- Medial collateral artery
- Radial collateral artery
- Superior ulnar collateral artery
