= Articulationes membri liberi =

Articulationes membri liberi may refer to:

- Articulationes membri inferioris liberi
- Articulationes membri superioris liberi
