= Supracondylar ridge =

Supracondylar ridge may refer to:

- Lateral supracondylar ridge
- Medial supracondylar ridge
