= Radial collateral artery =

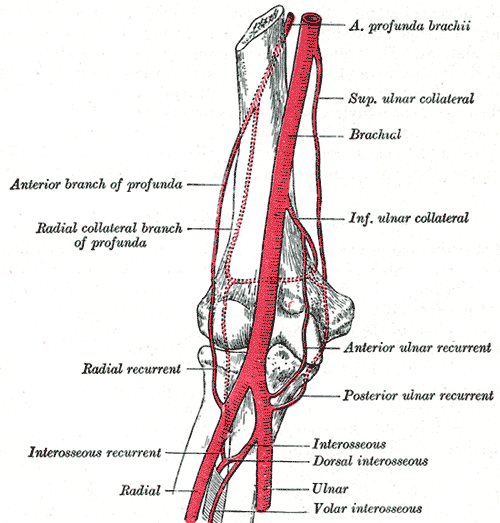
- Diagram of the anastomosis around the elbow-joint. (Radial collateral branch labeled at center left.)

Details
- Source: Profunda brachii

Identifiers
- Latin: arteria collateralis radialis
- TA98: A12.2.09.024
- TA2: 4638
- FMA: 23120

The radial collateral artery (another term for the anterior descending branch of the profunda brachii artery) is a branch of the deep brachial artery. It arises in the arm proper and anastomoses with the radial recurrent artery near the elbow.

== See also ==
- superior ulnar collateral artery
- inferior ulnar collateral artery
- medial collateral artery

== Additional images ==
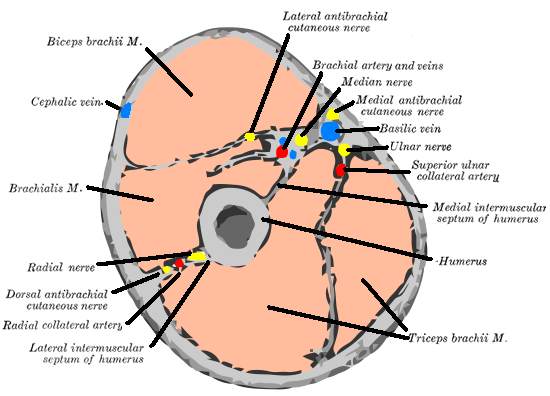
Cross-section through the middle of upper arm.

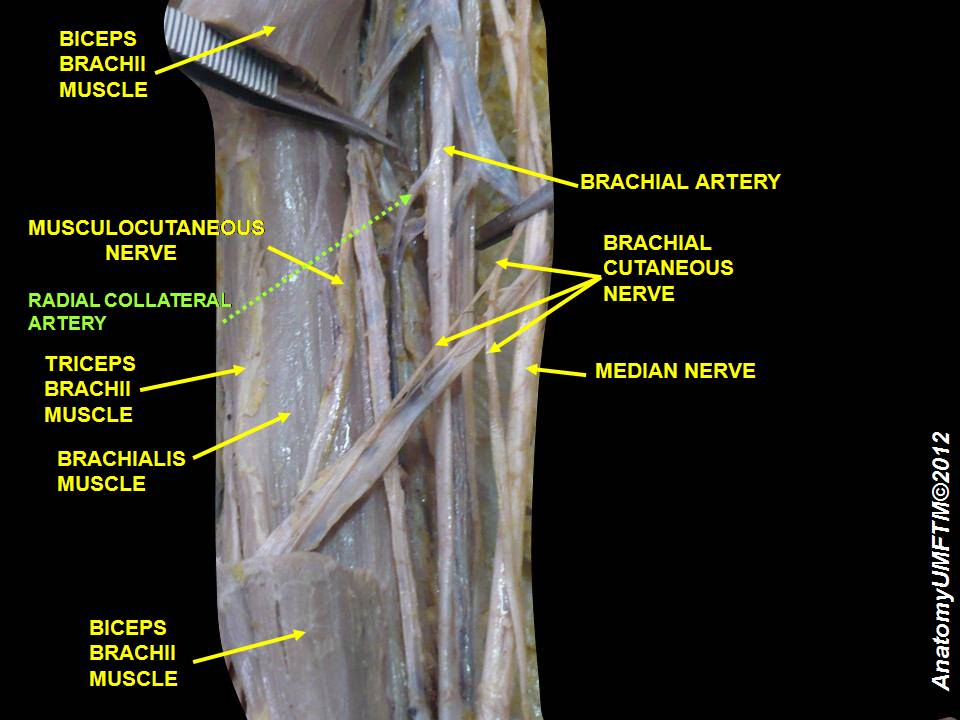
Radial collateral artery
