= Fascial compartments of arm =

Anatomical compartments

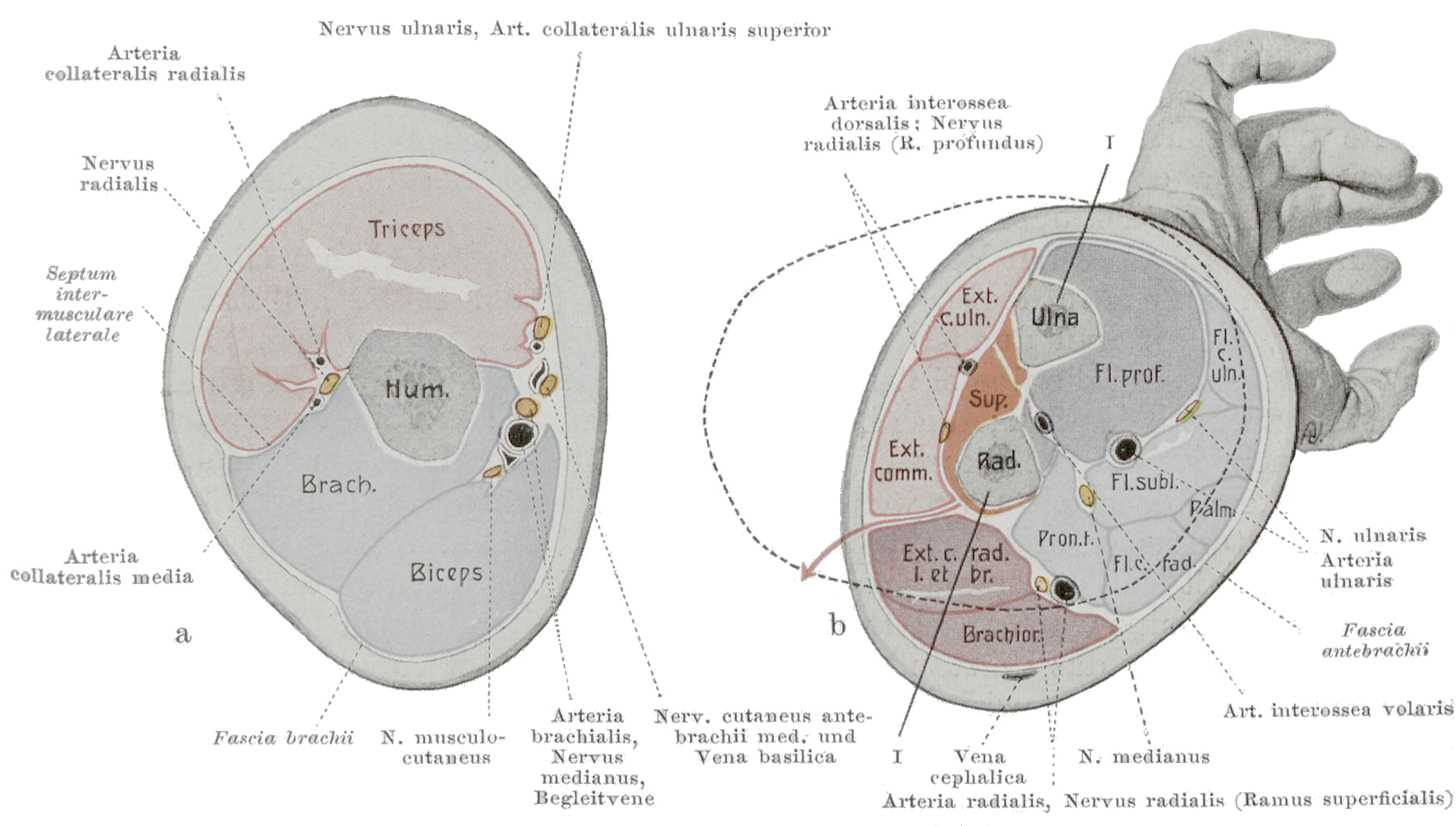
- Cross section showing the fascial compartments of the upper and lower arm

Identifiers
- TA98: A04.6.01.001
- FMA: 265176

The fascial compartments of arm refers to the specific anatomical term of the compartments within the upper segment of the upper limb (the arm) of the body. The upper limb is divided into two segments, the arm and the forearm. Each of these segments is further divided into two compartments which are formed by deep fascia – tough connective tissue septa (walls). Each compartment encloses specific muscles and nerves.

The compartments of the arm are the anterior compartment of the arm and the posterior compartment of the arm, divided by the lateral and the medial intermuscular septa. The compartments of the forearm are the anterior compartment of the forearm and posterior compartment of the forearm.

== Intermuscular septa ==
The lateral intermuscular septum extends from the lower part of the crest of the greater tubercle of the humerus, along the lateral supracondylar ridge, to the lateral epicondyle; it is blended with the tendon of the deltoid muscle, gives attachment to the triceps brachii behind, and to the brachialis, brachioradialis, and extensor carpi radialis longus muscles in front. It is perforated by the radial nerve and profunda branch of the brachial artery.

The medial intermuscular septum, is thicker than the lateral intermuscular septum. It extends from the lower part of the crest of the lesser tubercle of the humerus below the teres major, and passes along the medial supracondylar ridge to the medial epicondyle; it is blended with the tendon of the coracobrachialis, and gives attachment to the triceps brachii behind and the brachialis in front.

It is perforated by the ulnar nerve, the superior ulnar collateral artery, and the posterior branch of the inferior ulnar collateral artery.

== Anterior compartment ==
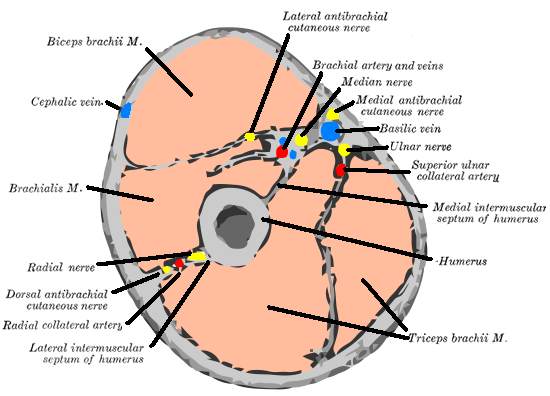
Anterior (at top) and posterior (at bottom) compartments

The anterior compartment of the arm is also known as the flexor compartment of the arm as its main action is that of flexion. The anterior compartment is one of the two anatomic compartments of the upper arm, the other being the posterior compartment.

The compartment contains three muscles; the biceps brachii, the brachialis and the coracobrachialis. These muscles are all innervated by the musculocutaneous nerve which arises from the fifth and sixth and seventh cervical spinal nerves. The blood supply is from the brachial artery.

== Posterior compartment ==
The posterior compartment of the arm is also known as the extensor compartment, as its main action is extension.

The muscles of this compartment are the triceps brachii and anconeus muscle and these are innervated by the radial nerve. Their blood supply is from the profunda brachii.

The triceps brachii is a large muscle containing three heads a lateral, medial, and middle. The anconeus is a small muscle that stabilizes the elbow joint during movement. Some embryologists consider it as the fourth head of the triceps brachia as the upper and lower limbs have similar embryological origins, and the lower limb contains the quadriceps femoris muscle which has four heads, and is the lower limb equivalent of the triceps.

== See also ==
- Anterior compartment of the forearm
- Posterior compartment of the forearm
- Compartment syndrome
- Fascia
- Fascial compartments of leg
