= Medial supracondylar ridge =

Inferior third of the medial border of the humerus

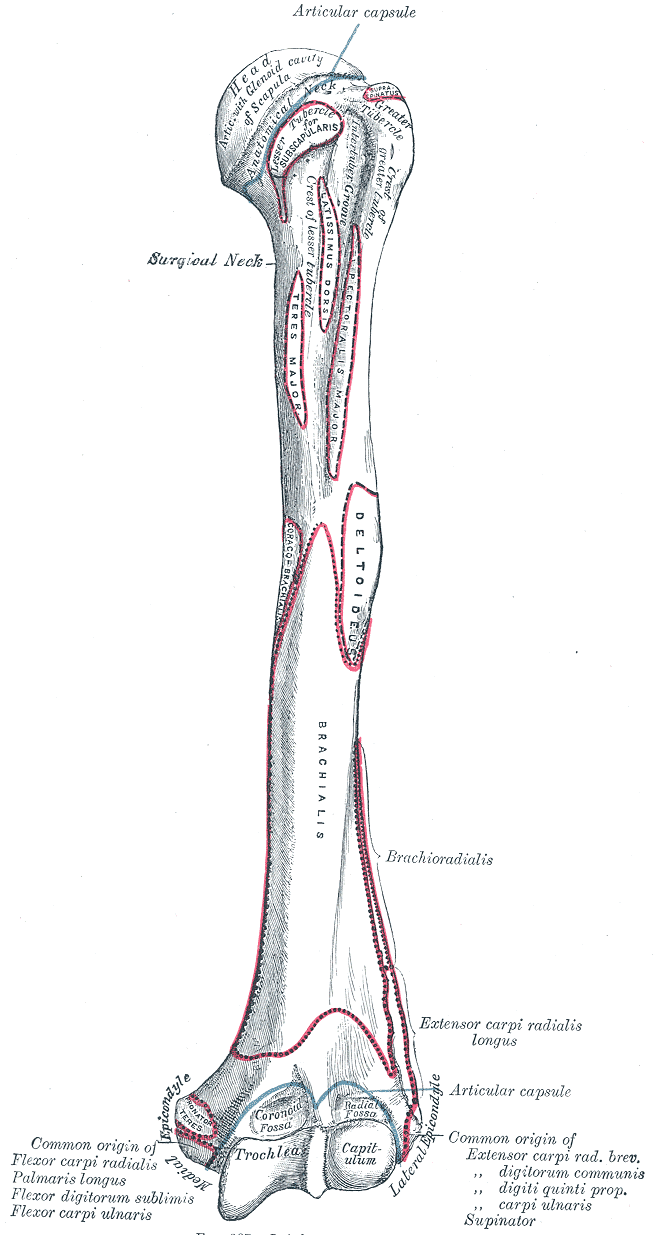
- Left humerus. Anterior view. (Medial supracondylar ridge on side at bottom left, but not labeled.)

Details

Identifiers
- Latin: crista supracondylaris medialis
- TA98: A02.4.04.016
- TA2: 1199
- FMA: 75076

The inferior third of the medial border of the humerus is raised into a slight ridge, the medial supracondylar ridge (or medial supracondylar line), which becomes very prominent below; it presents an anterior lip for the origins of the Brachialis and Pronator teres, a posterior lip for the medial head of the Triceps brachii, and an intermediate ridge for the attachment of the medial intermuscular septum.
