= Anconeus muscle =

Muscle on the elbow joint

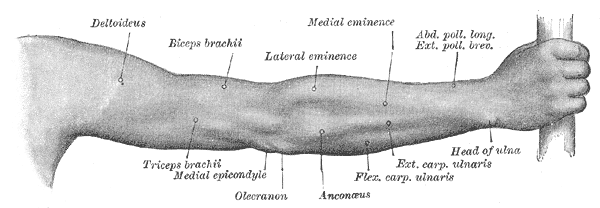
- Back of right upper extremity. (Anconeus labeled at bottom center.)

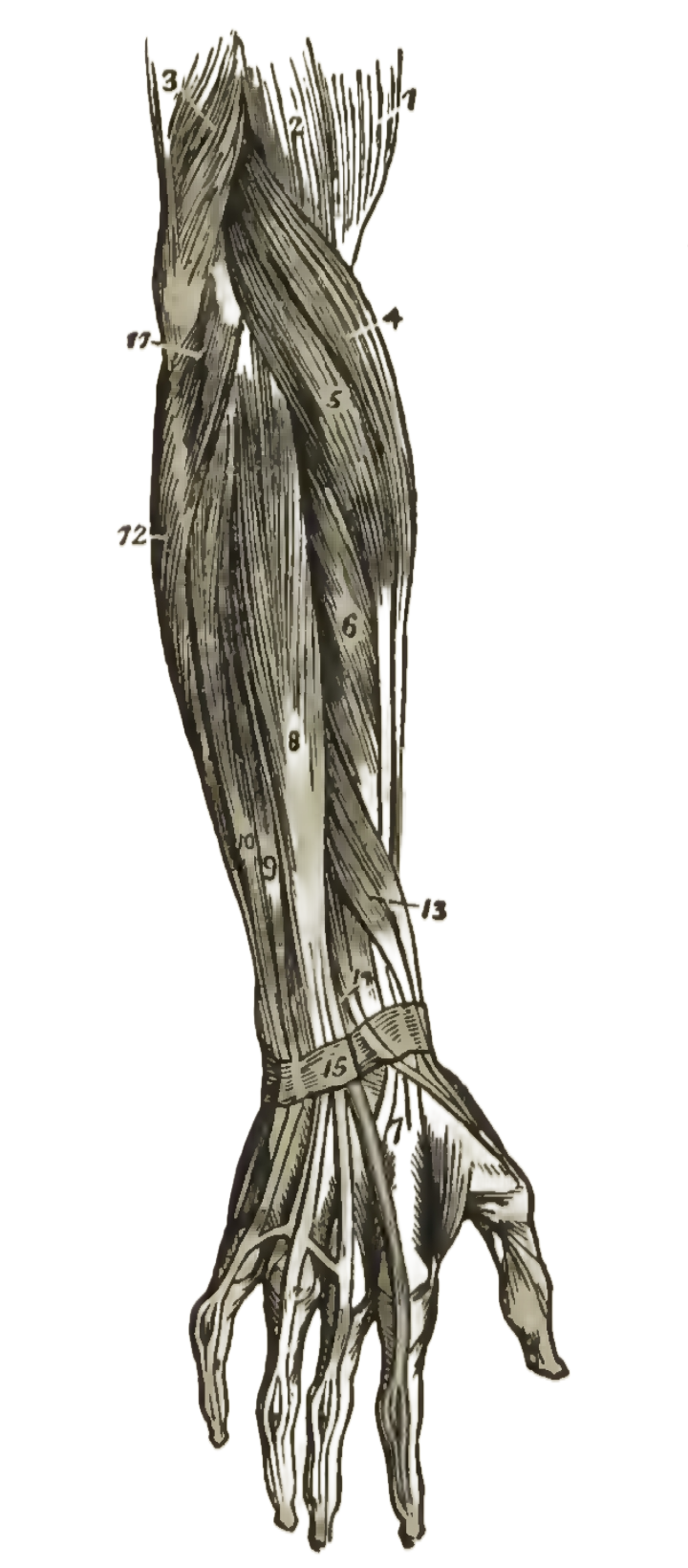
- Posterior surface of the right forearm. Superficial muscles. (Anconeus labeled 11 at upper left.)

Details
- Origin: Lateral epicondyle of the humerus proximally
- Insertion: Lateral surface of the olecranon process of the ulna and the superior proximal part of the posterior ulna
- Artery: Deep brachial artery, recurrent interosseous artery
- Nerve: Radial nerve (C5, C6, C7, C8, and T1)
- Actions: It is partly blended in with the triceps, which it assists in extension of the elbow. It also stabilizes the elbow during pronation and supination and pulls slack out of the elbow joint capsule during extension to prevent impingement.

Identifiers
- Latin: musculus anconeus, musculus anconaeus
- TA98: A04.6.02.023
- TA2: 2510
- FMA: 37704

The anconeus muscle (or anconaeus/anconæus) is a small triangular muscle placed behind and below the elbow joint, and seems to be continuous by its upper margin with the lateral part of the triceps.

Some consider anconeus to be a continuation of the triceps brachii muscle. Some sources consider it to be part of the posterior compartment of the arm, while others consider it part of the posterior compartment of the forearm.

The anconeus muscle can easily be palpated just lateral to the olecranon process of the ulna.

== Structure ==
Anconeus originates by a separate tendon (i.e., not by the common extensor tendon) from the posterior surface of the lateral epicondyle of the humerus and inserts distally on the upper fourth of the posterior surface of the ulna and the lateral aspect of the olecranon.

=== Innervation ===
Anconeus is innervated by a branch of the radial nerve (cervical roots 7 and 8) from the posterior cord of the brachial plexus called the nerve to the anconeus. The somatomotor portion of radial nerve innervating anconeus bifurcates from the main branch in the radial groove of the humerus. This innervation pattern follows the rules of innervation of the musculature of the posterior forearm (extensor) compartment by the radial nerve.

== Function ==
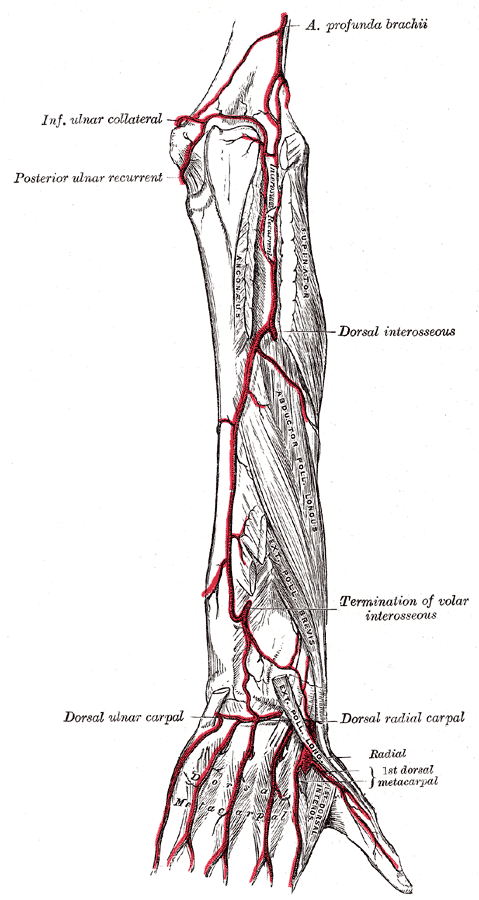
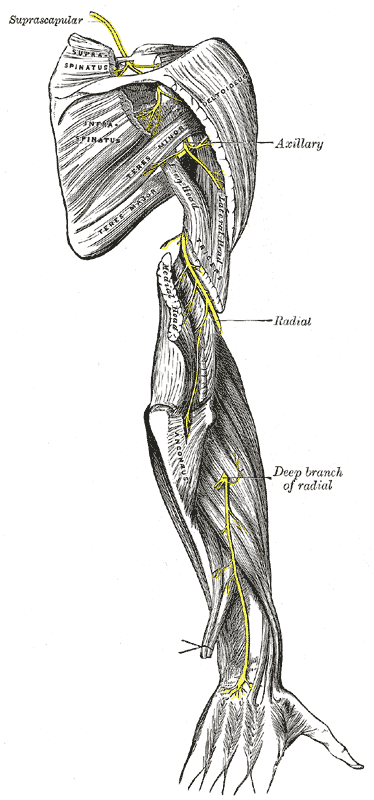
Arteries and nerves of the back of the arm

Its role in elbow extension is trivial in humans. It assists in extension of the elbow, where the triceps brachii is the principal agonist, and supports the elbow in full extension. It also prevents the elbow joint capsule being pinched in the olecranon fossa during extension of the elbow. Anconeus also abducts the ulna and stabilizes the elbow joint. Anconeus serves to make minute movements with the radius on the ulna. In making slight abduction of the ulna, it allows any finger to be used as an axis of rotation of the forearm.

=== Blood supply ===
Anconeus is supplied by the middle collateral artery from the profunda brachii artery.

== Clinical significance ==
Trauma to the nerve supply of the anconeus muscle can usually result from a shoulder dislocation or fractures of the upper part of the humerus or around the olecranon, or any injury that damages the radial nerve. Harm inflicted upon the radial nerve through these mechanisms can paralyze the anconeus muscle as well as other extensors of the elbow and wrist. There are no specific acquired injuries that exclusively affect the anconeus muscle; however, any disease that compromises muscular functions, particularly arm extension (i.e. muscular dystrophy) will affect this particular accessory muscle. Heterotopic ossification can result from certain trauma as it is an abnormal growth of osseous tissue in non-osseous tissue (e.g. muscle tissue). The condition is usually found in the hips, although there have been documented cases of certain individuals with it occurring in the arms and legs. The cause for the process to initiate is not well understood, only that it typically results from surgery or trauma.

== History ==
=== Etymology and spelling ===
Anconeus muscle is the anglicized form of the Latin expression musculus anconaeus, as can be found in the Nomina Anatomica as ratified in Basel in 1895 and in Jena in 1935. The anatomic Latin adjective anconaeus was written as anconeus in the subsequent edition of the Nomina Anatomica as authorized in 1955 in Paris, without any further explanation of this specific diphthong reduction. The following edition of 1961 specified its policy by stating that: All diphthongs should be eliminated. Although a selected number of monophthongizations was reverted, subsequent editions of the Nomina Anatomica and its most recent outing Terminologia Anatomica insisted on writing musculus anconeus. Despite the earlier preference of the Nomina Anatomica for anconaeus no ancient Greek form ἀγκωναῖος is attested. In modern Greek the expression ἀγκωνιαίος μυς is used, with the from anconaeus deviating adjective ἀγκωνιαίος.

Anconaeus is derived from the ancient Greek noun, ἀγκών. 'Ακών can be translated as bend of the arm or elbow. The expression musculus anconaeus was translated into English as elbow muscle in 1907 in the English translation of the first edition of the Nomina Anatomica.

== Additional images ==
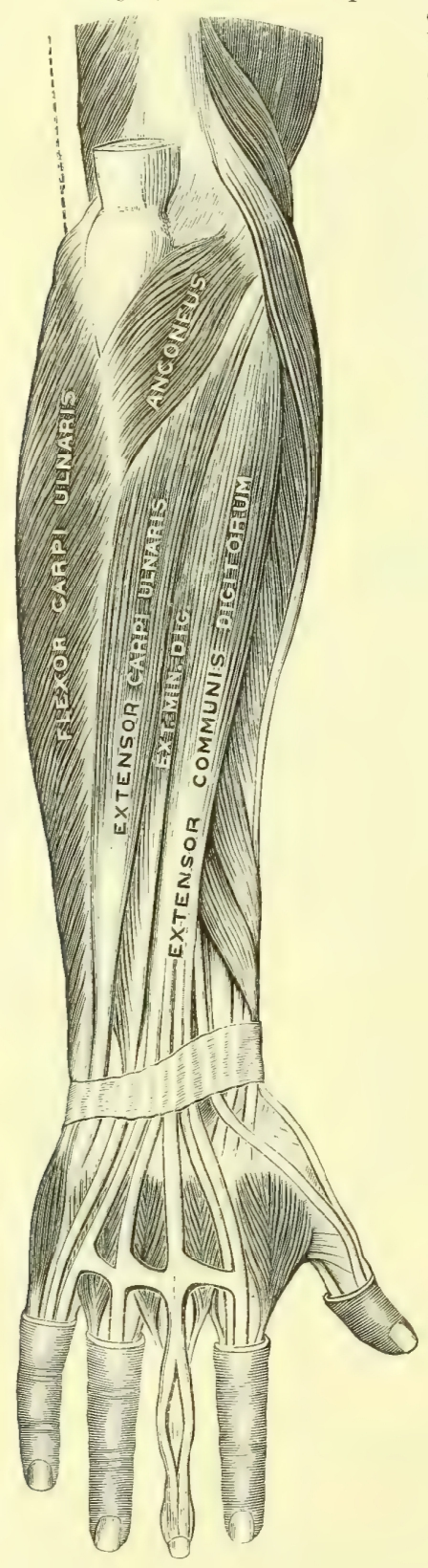
Anconeus and other muscles in the dorsum of the right forearm and hand. (After Testut.)

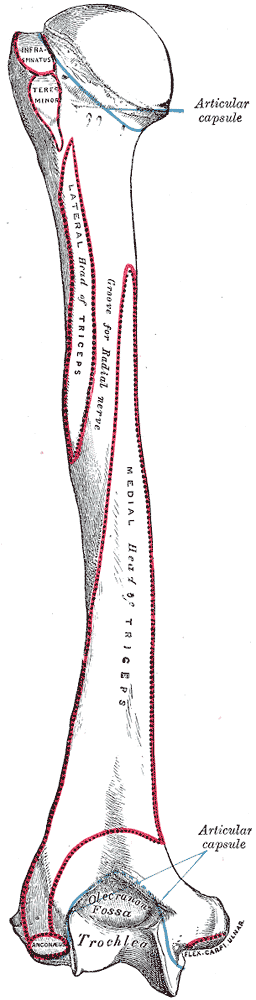
Posterior view of left humerus

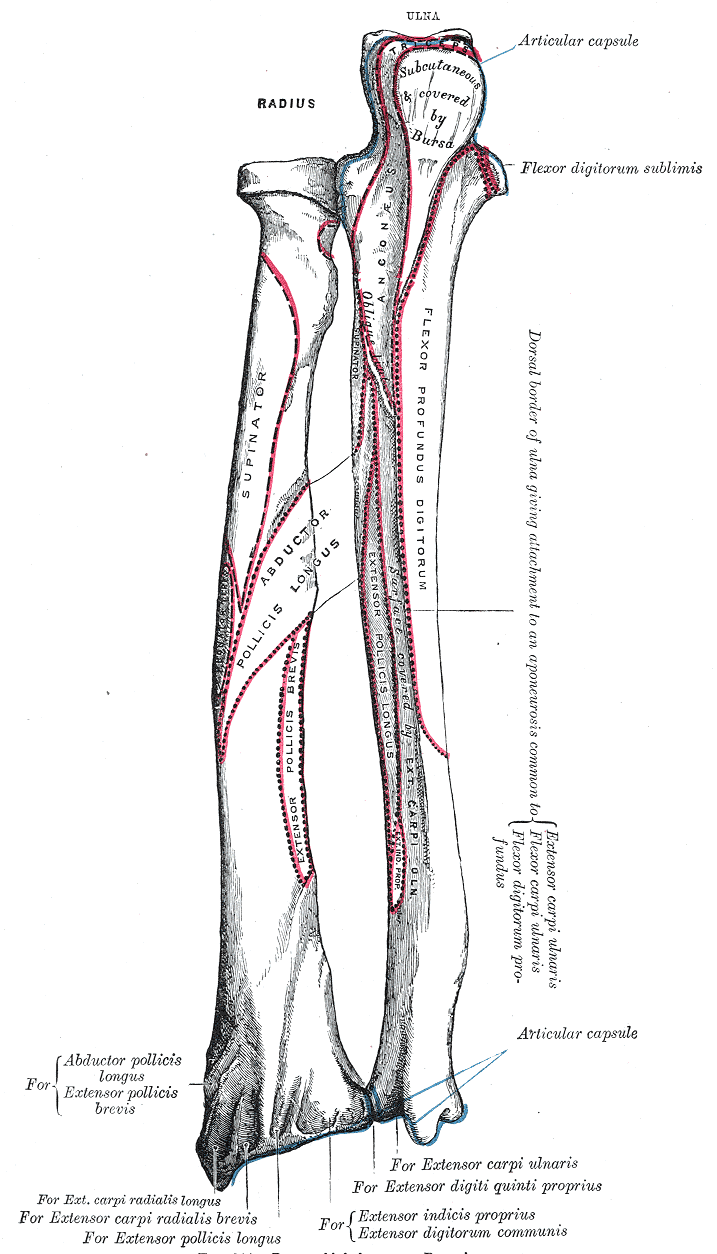
Posterior aspect of bones of left forearm

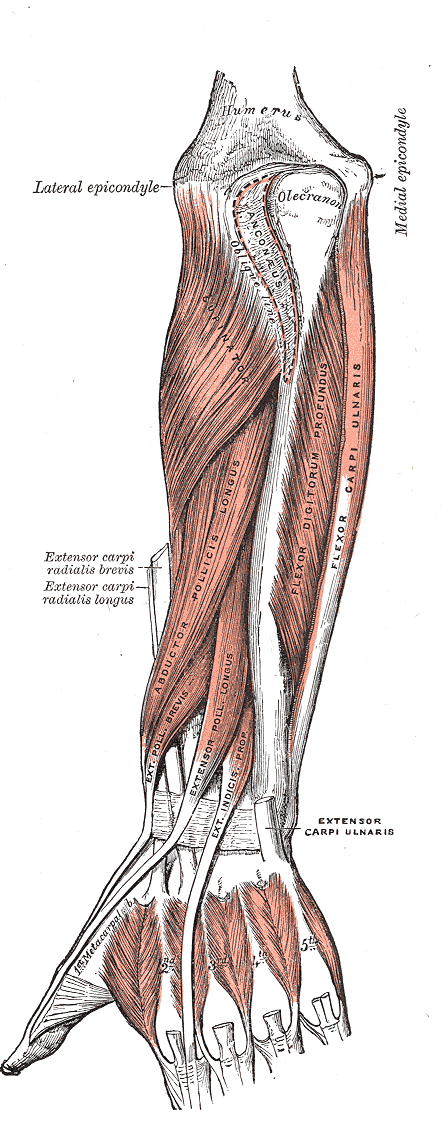
Deep muscles of posterior surface of the forearm

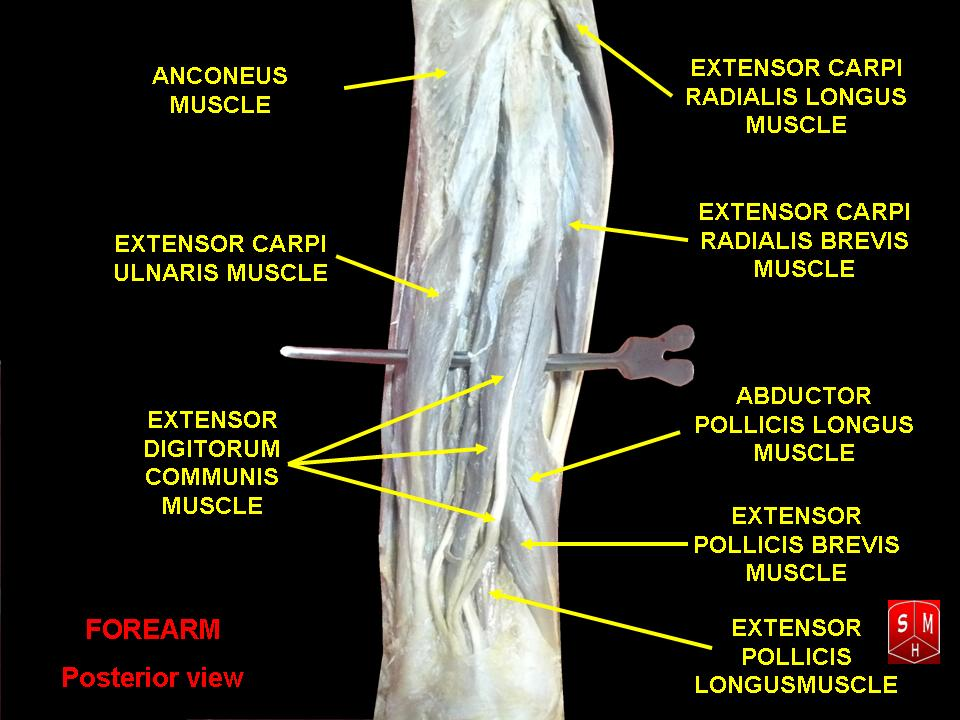
Forearm posterior view

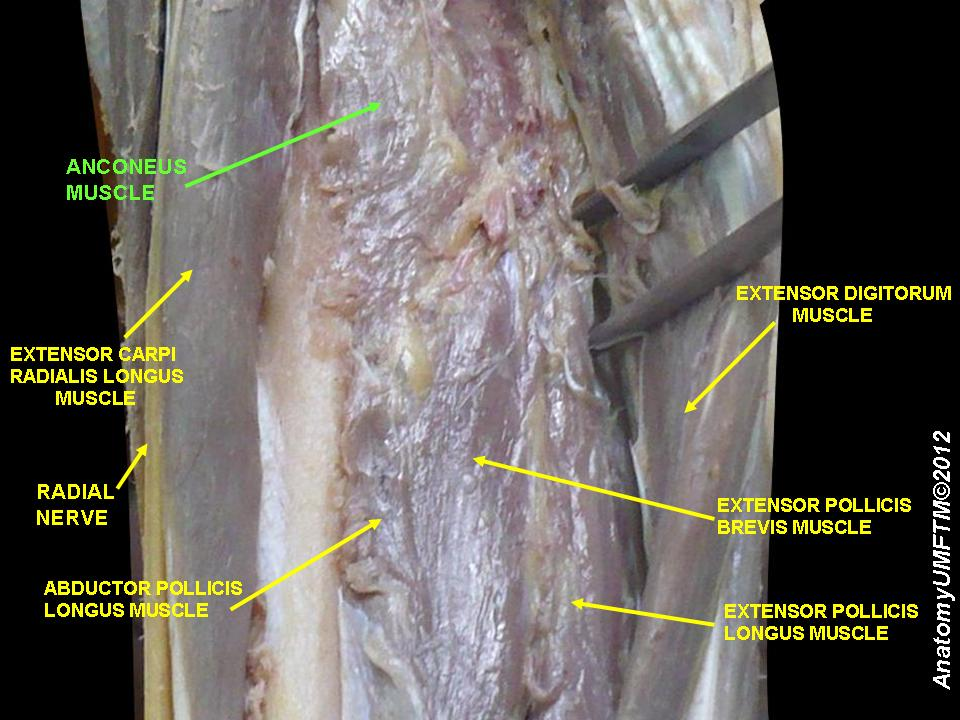
Anconeus muscle

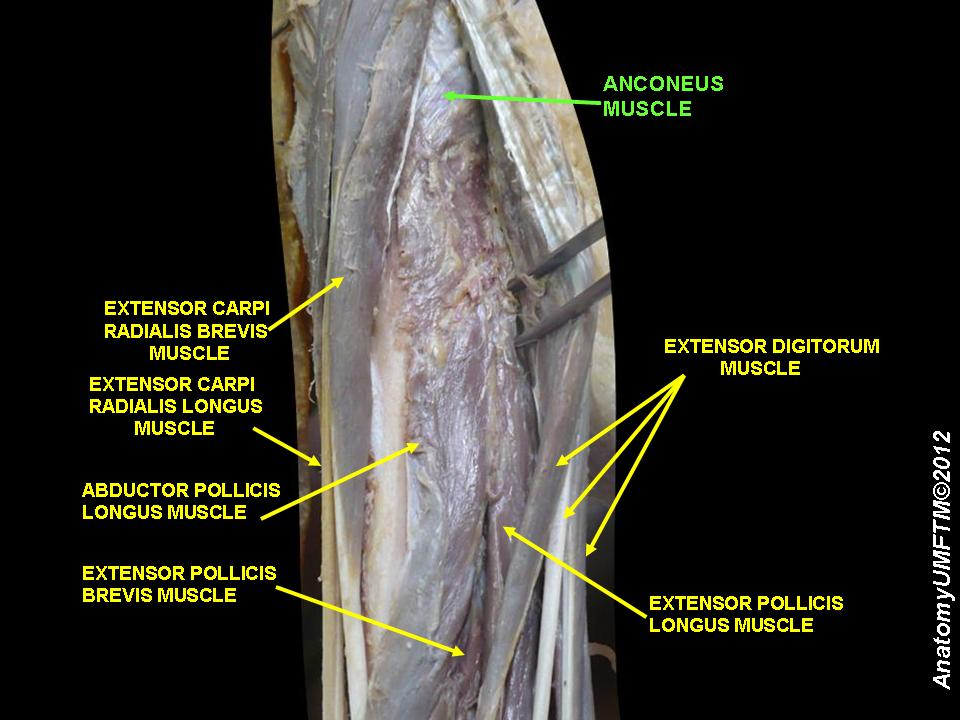
Anconeus muscle

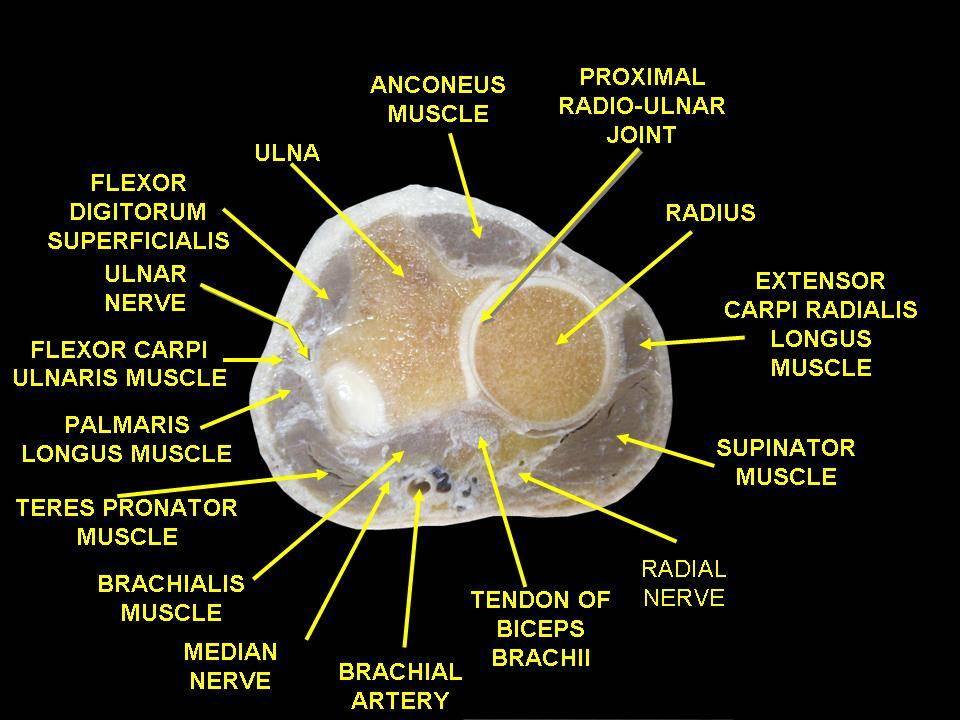
Muscles of upper limb. Cross section.
