= Deep artery of arm =

Deep arterial system of the arm

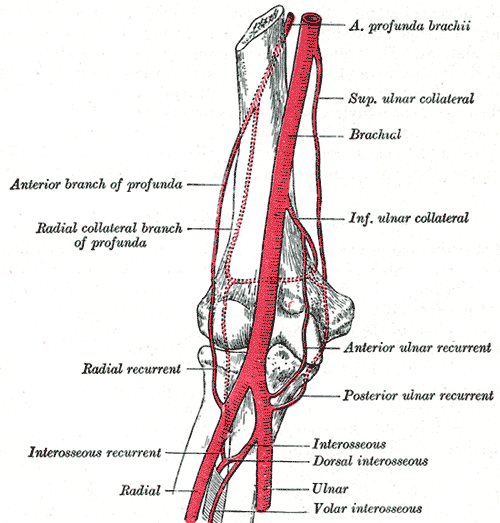
- Diagram of the anastomosis around the elbow-joint. (A. profunda brachii labeled at upper right.)

Details
- Source: Brachial artery
- Branches: Radial collateral medial collateral branches to the deltoid muscle
- Supplies: Deltoid muscle, triceps brachii, anconeus

Identifiers
- Latin: arteria profunda brachii
- TA98: A12.2.09.020
- TA2: 4634
- FMA: 22695

The deep artery of arm (also known as deep brachial artery) is a large artery of the arm which arises from the brachial artery. It descends in the arm before ending by anastomosing with the radial recurrent artery.

== Structure ==
=== Origin ===
The deep artery of arm arises from the posterolateral aspect of the brachial artery, just below the lower border of the teres major.

=== Course ===
It follows closely the radial nerve, running at first backward between the long and medial heads of the triceps brachii, then along the groove for the radial nerve (the radial sulcus), where it is covered by the lateral head of the triceps brachii, to the lateral side of the arm; there it pierces the lateral intermuscular septum, and, descending between the brachioradialis and the brachialis to the front of the lateral epicondyle of the humerus, ends by anastomosing with the radial recurrent artery.

=== Branches and anastomoses ===
It gives branches to the deltoid muscle (which, however, primarily is supplied by the posterior circumflex humeral artery) and to the muscles between which it lies; it supplies an occasional nutrient artery which enters the humerus behind the deltoid tuberosity.

A branch ascends between the long and lateral heads of the triceps brachii to anastomose with the posterior humeral circumflex artery; the medial collateral artery, a branch, descends in the middle head of the triceps brachii and assists in forming the anastomosis above the olecranon of the ulna; and, lastly, a radial collateral artery runs down behind the lateral intermuscular septum to the back of the lateral epicondyle of the humerus, where it anastomoses with the interosseous recurrent and the inferior ulnar collateral arteries.

== Additional images ==
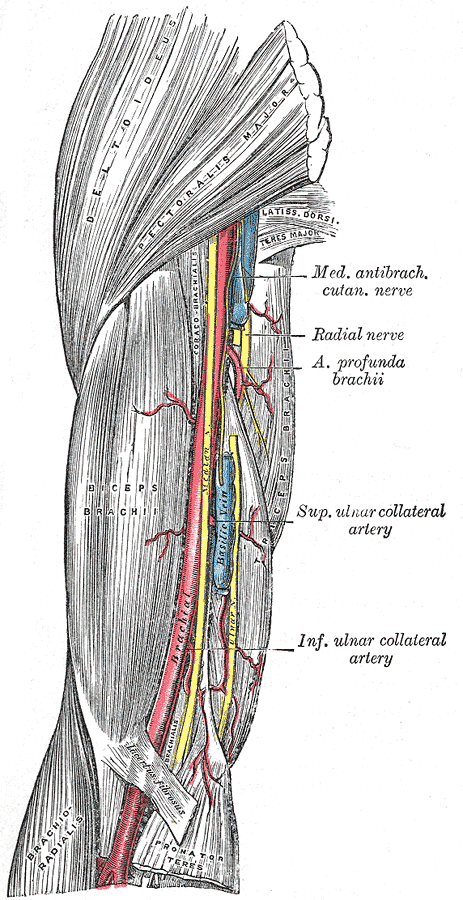
The brachial artery.

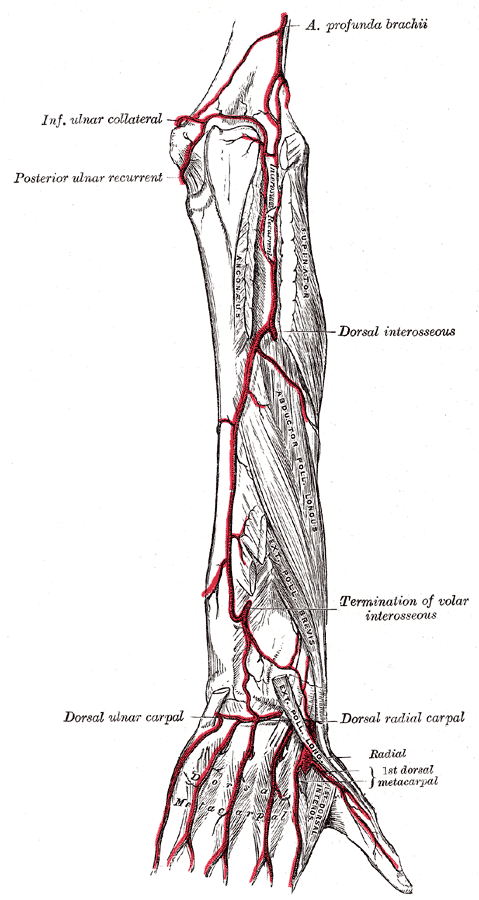
Arteries of the back of the forearm and hand.

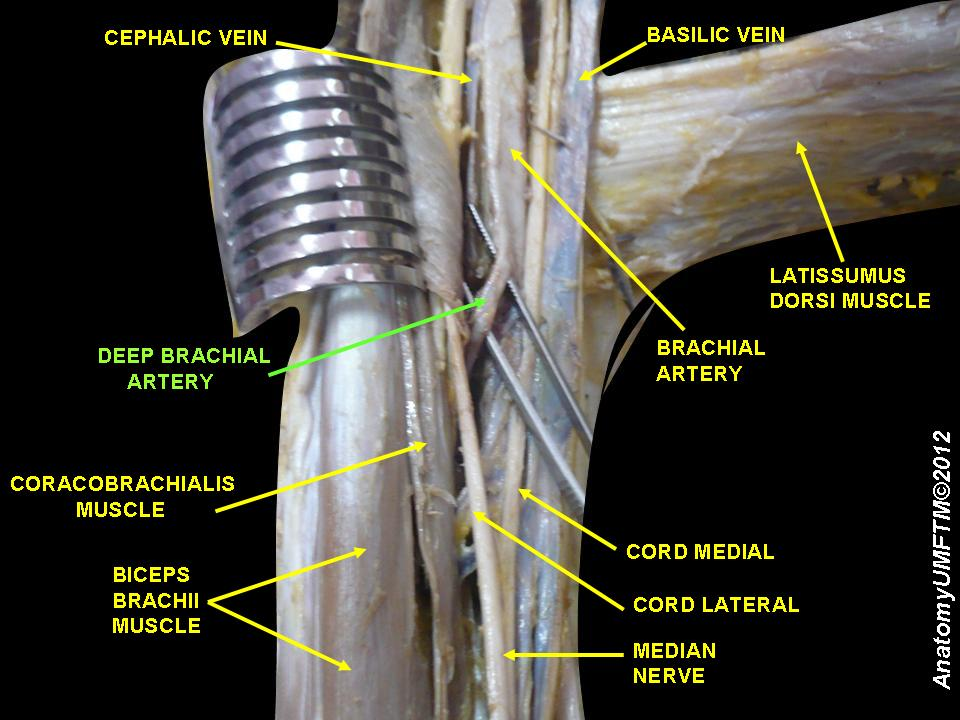
Deep brachial artery

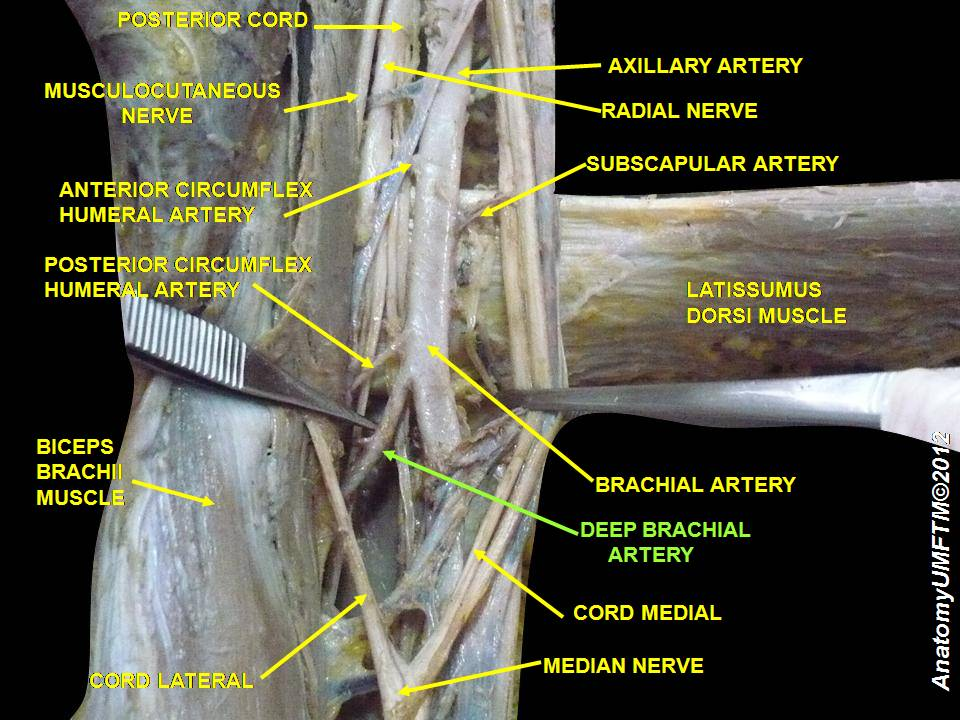
Deep brachial artery
