= Common interosseous artery =

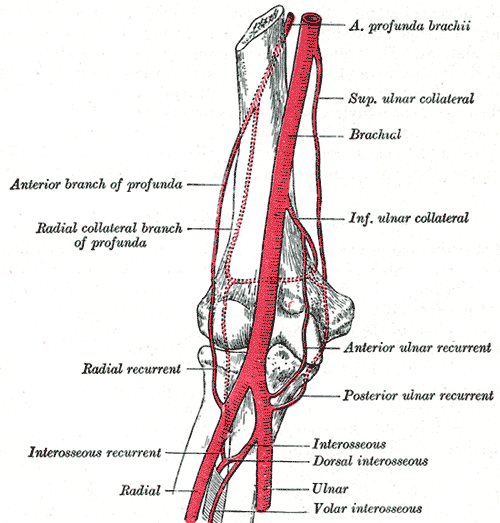
- Diagram of the anastomosis around the elbow-joint.

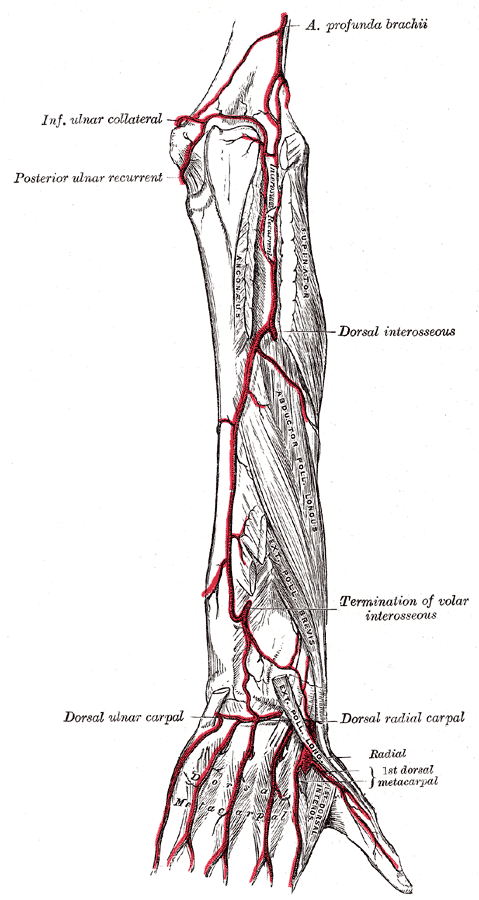
- Arteries of the back of the forearm and hand.

Details
- Source: Ulnar artery
- Branches: Anterior interosseous, posterior interosseous

Identifiers
- Latin: arteria interossea communis
- TA98: A12.2.09.047
- TA2: 4661
- FMA: 22806

The common interosseous artery, about 1 cm. in length, arises immediately below the tuberosity of the radius from the ulnar artery.

Passing backward to the upper border of the interosseous membrane, it divides into two branches, the anterior interosseous and posterior interosseous arteries.

== Additional images ==
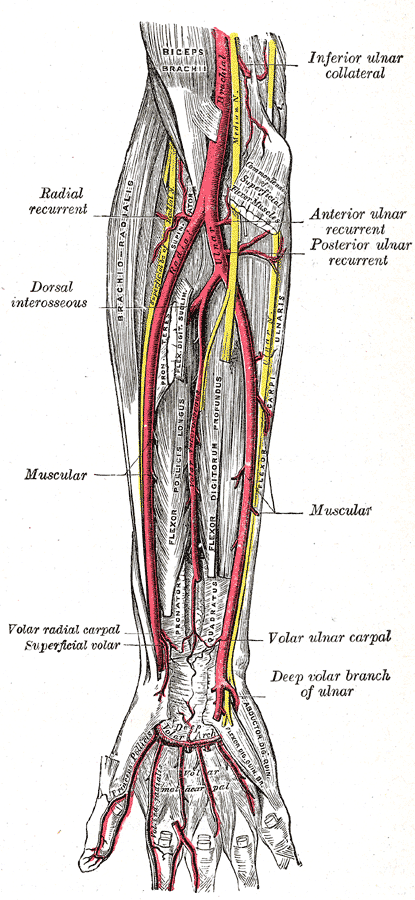
Ulnar and radial arteries. Deep view.

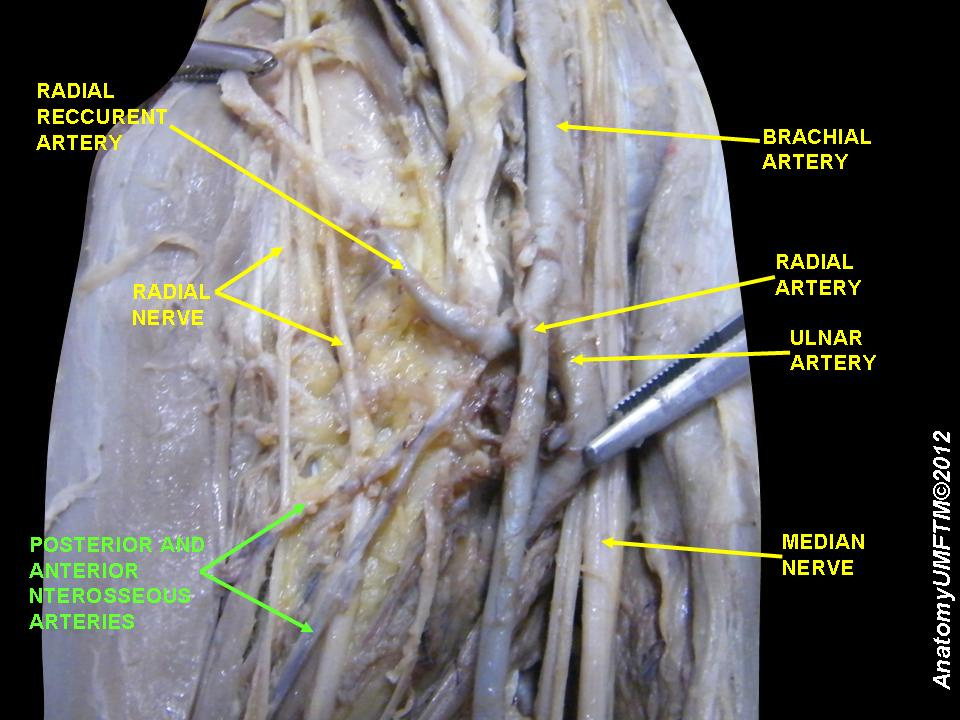
Anterior and posterior interosseous artery

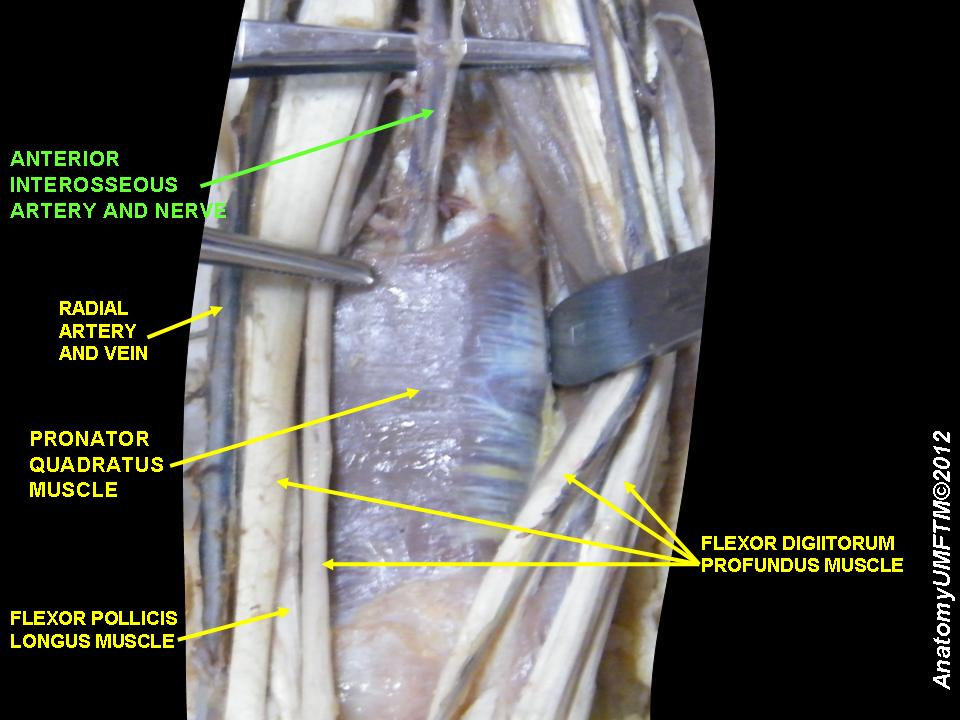
Anterior interosseous artery and nerve
