= Radial groove =

Spiral groove on the surface of the humerus

Humerus
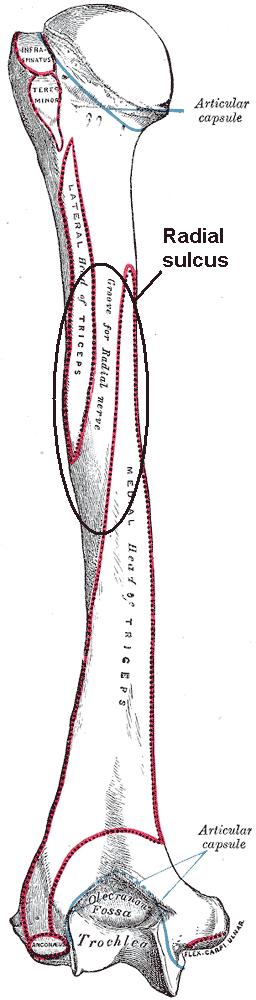
- Left humerus. Posterior view. (Label, visible at center, is "Groove for radial nerve")

Details

Identifiers
- Latin: sulcus nervi radialis
- TA98: A02.4.04.014
- TA2: 1197
- FMA: 23417

The radial groove (also known as the musculospiral groove, radial sulcus, or spiral groove) is a broad but shallow oblique depression for the radial nerve and deep brachial artery. It is located on the center of the lateral border of the humerus bone. It is situated alongside the posterior margin of the deltoid tuberosity, ending at its inferior margin.

Although it provides protection to the radial nerve, it is often involved in compressions on the nerve (due to external pressure due to surgery) that can cause radial nerve palsy.

== See also ==
- Intertubercular groove
- Triceps brachii muscle

== Additional images ==
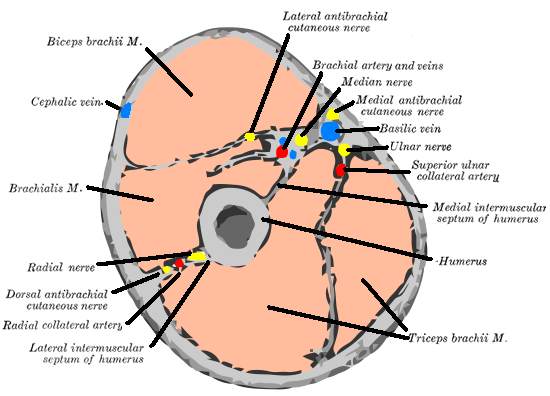
Cross-section through the middle of upper arm.

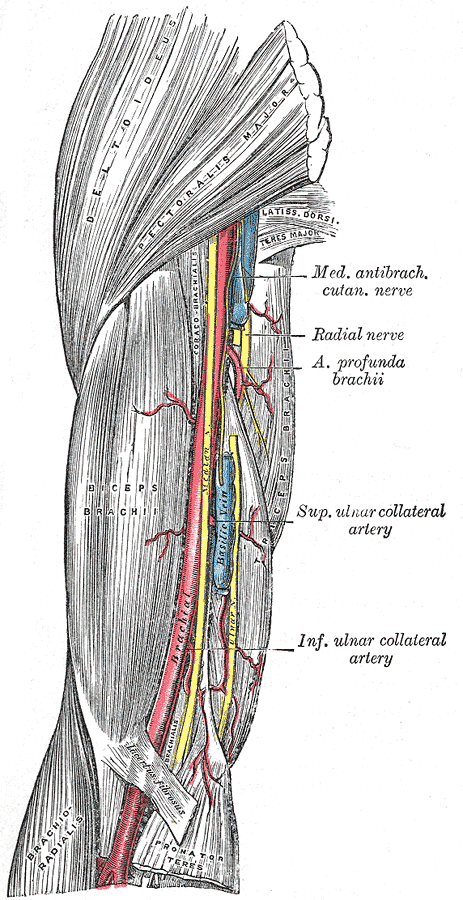
The brachial artery.

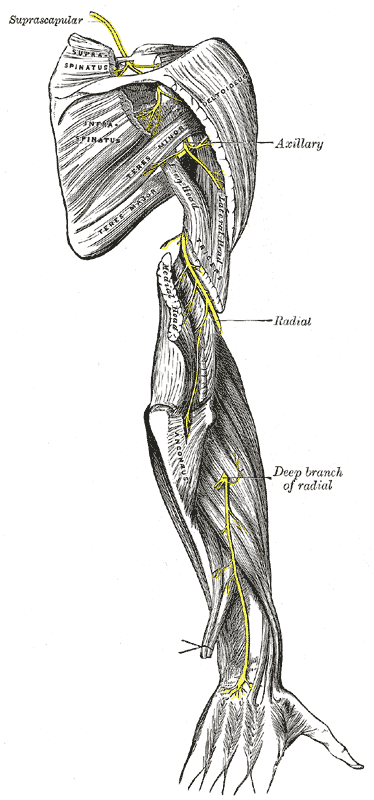
The suprascapular, axillary, and radial nerves.
