= Interosseous recurrent artery =

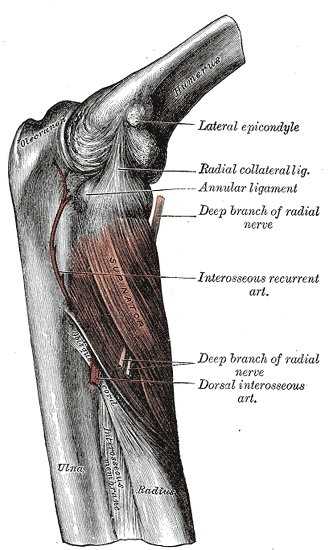
- The supinator. (Interosseus recurrent art. labeled at center right.)

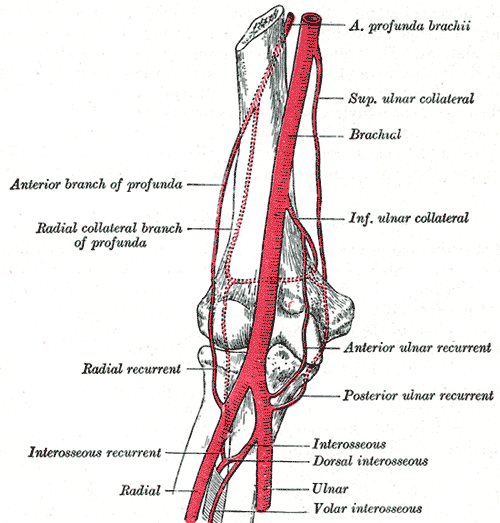
- Diagram of the anastomosis around the elbow-joint. (Interosseus recurrent labeled at lower left.)

Details
- Source: Posterior interosseous artery

Identifiers
- Latin: arteria interossea recurrens
- TA98: A12.2.09.052
- TA2: 4666
- FMA: 77144

The posterior interosseous recurrent artery (or recurrent interosseous artery) branches off the posterior interosseous artery near its origin. It ascends between the lateral epicondyle and olecranon, beneath the anconeus, upon or through the substance of the supinator muscle. It anastomoses with the middle collateral artery, posterior ulnar recurrent artery, and Inferior ulnar collateral artery. The artery is sometimes absent.
