= Medial collateral artery =

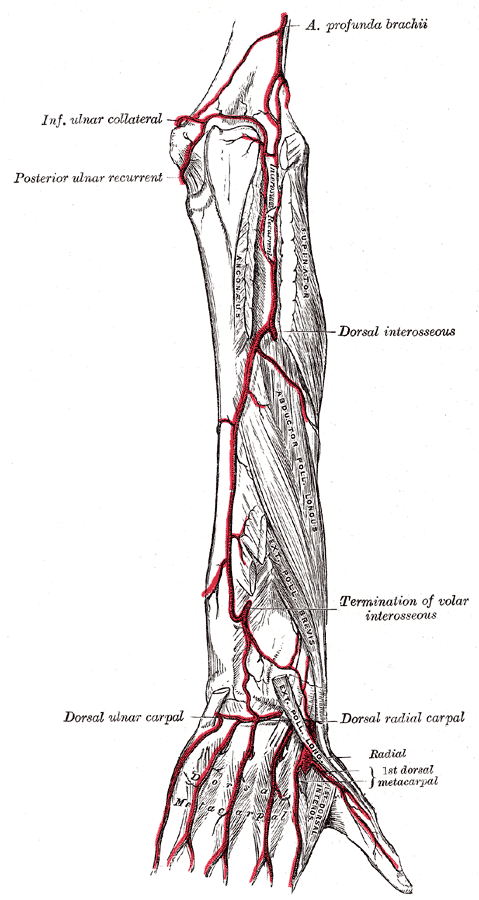
- Arteries of the back of the forearm and hand. (Medial collateral artery not labeled, but region is visible.)

Details
- Source: Profunda brachii
- Supplies: Triceps

Identifiers
- Latin: arteria collateralis media
- TA98: A12.2.09.023
- TA2: 4637
- FMA: 23119

The medial collateral artery (also known as the middle collateral artery) is a branch of profunda brachii artery that descends in the middle head of the triceps brachii and assists in forming the anastomosis with the interosseous recurrent artery above the olecranon of the ulna near the elbow.

== See also ==
- radial collateral artery
- superior ulnar collateral artery
- inferior ulnar collateral artery
