= Triceps =

Muscle on the back of the upper arm

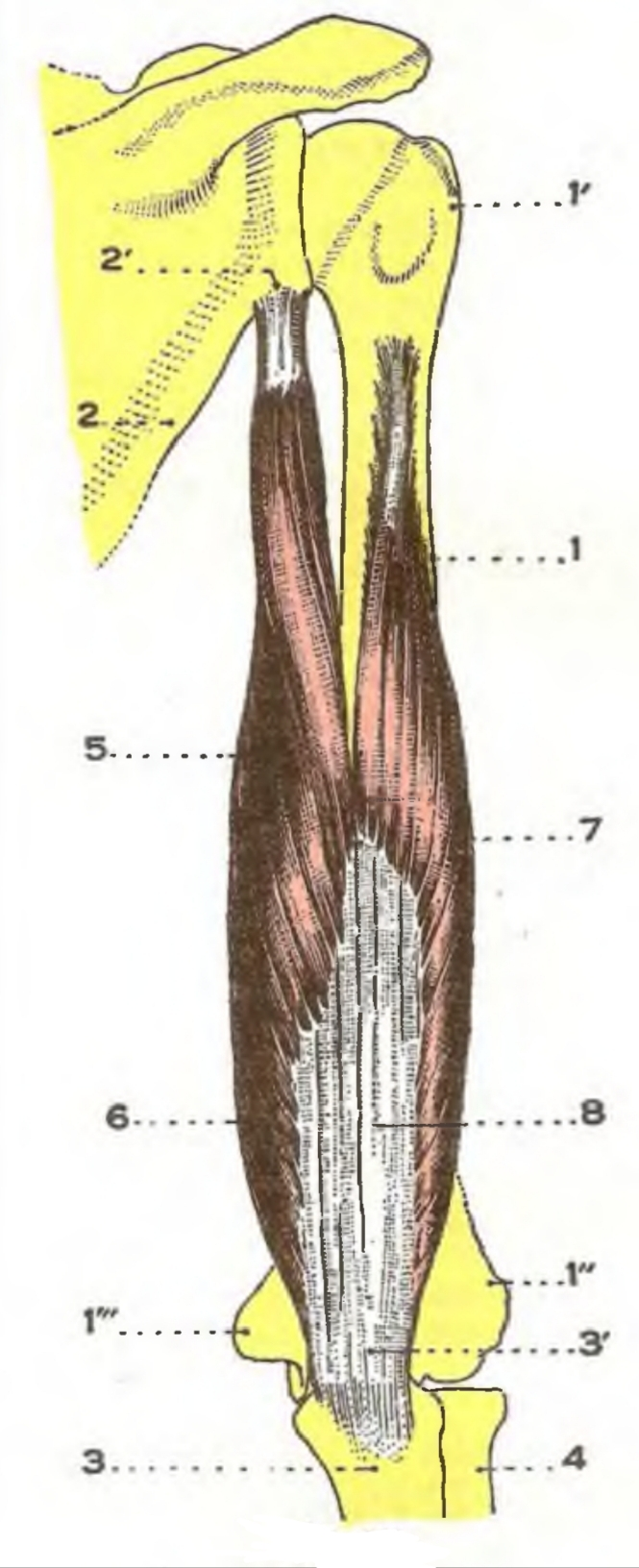
- Right-sided triceps brachii seen from behind. (After Testut's Anatomy.)

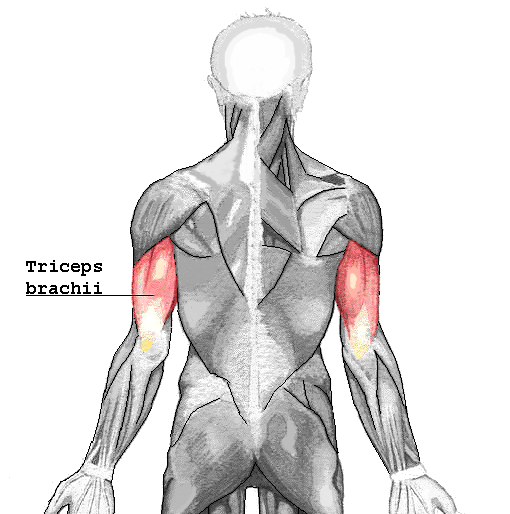
- Triceps brachii seen from behind.

Details
- Origin: Long head: infraglenoid tubercle of scapula Lateral head: above the radial groove Medial head: below the radial groove
- Insertion: Olecranon process of ulna
- Artery: Deep brachial artery, posterior circumflex humeral artery (long head only)
- Nerve: Radial nerve
- Actions: Extends forearm, long head extends, adducts arm, extends shoulder
- Antagonist: Biceps brachii muscle

Identifiers
- Latin: musculus triceps brachii
- TA98: A04.6.02.019
- TA2: 2471
- FMA: 37688

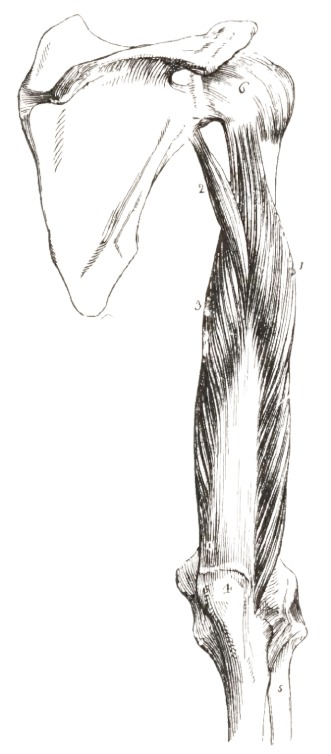
Drawing of the right-sided triceps brachii, depicting its three heads; posterior view. 1, Lateral head. — 2, Long or scapular head. — 3, Medial or short head. — 4, Olecranon (ulna). — 5, Radius. — 6, Capsular ligament of the shoulder joint. (After Hughes.)

The triceps, or triceps brachii (Latin for "three-headed muscle of the arm"), is a large muscle on the back of the upper limb of many vertebrates. It consists of three parts: the medial, lateral, and long head. All three heads cross the elbow joint. However, the long head also crosses the shoulder joint. The triceps muscle contracts when the elbow is straightened and expands when the elbow is bent. The long head gets a further contraction when the arm is behind the torso due to how it crosses the shoulder joint. It is the muscle principally responsible for extension of the elbow joint (straightening of the arm).

== Structure ==
- The long head arises from the infraglenoid tubercle of the scapula. It extends distally anterior to the teres minor and posterior to the teres major.
- The medial head arises proximally in the humerus, just inferior to the groove of the radial nerve; from the dorsal (back) surface of the humerus; from the medial intermuscular septum; and its distal part also arises from the lateral intermuscular septum. The medial head is mostly covered by the lateral and long heads and is only visible distally on the humerus.
- The lateral head arises from the dorsal surface of the humerus, lateral and proximal to the groove of the radial nerve, from the greater tubercle down to the region of the lateral intermuscular septum.

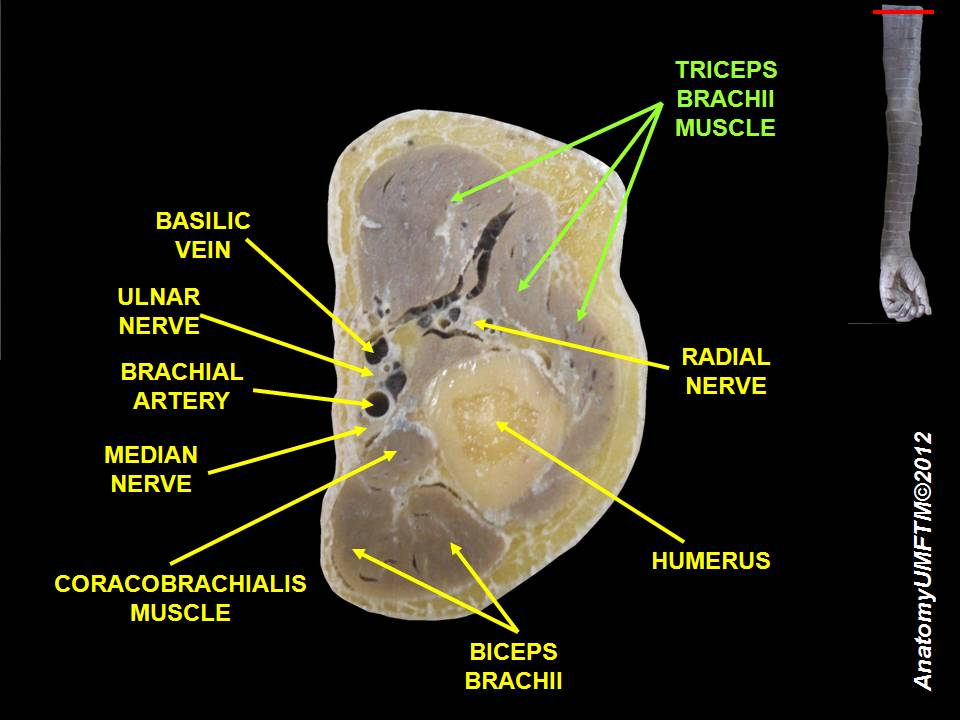
Horizontal section of upper arm. Triceps muscle is shown in green text

Each of the three fascicles has its own motorneuron subnucleus in the motor column in the spinal cord. The medial head is formed predominantly by small type I fibers and motor units, the lateral head of large type IIb fibers and motor units, and the long head of a mixture of fiber types and motor units. It has been suggested that each fascicle "may be considered an independent muscle with specific functional roles."

The fibers converge to a single tendon to insert onto the olecranon process of the ulna (though some research indicates that there may be more than one tendon) and to the posterior wall of the capsule of the elbow joint where bursae (cushion sacks) are often found. Parts of the common tendon radiate into the fascia of the forearm and can almost cover the anconeus muscle.

=== Innervation ===
All three heads of the triceps brachii are classically believed to be innervated by the radial nerve. However, more recent studies observed that in around 14% of individuals, the long head of the triceps brachii was innervated by the axillary nerve, and in 3% it received dual innervation from both the radial nerve and axillary nerve.

=== Variation ===
A tendinous arch is frequently the origin of the long head and the tendon of latissimus dorsi. In rare cases, the long head can originate from the lateral margin of the scapula and from the capsule of the shoulder joint.

== Function ==
The triceps is an extensor muscle of the elbow joint and an antagonist of the biceps and brachialis muscles. It can also fixate the elbow joint when the forearm and hand are used for fine movements, e.g., when writing. It has been suggested that the long head fascicle is employed when sustained force generation is demanded, or when there is a need for a synergistic control of the shoulder and elbow or both. The lateral head is used for movements requiring occasional high-intensity force, while the medial fascicle enables more precise, low-force movements.

With its origin on the scapula, the long head also acts on the shoulder joint and is also involved in retroversion and adduction of the arm. It helps stabilise the shoulder joint at the top of the humerus.

== Training ==
The triceps can be stimulated through either isolated elbow extension movements or compound pressing movements and can contract statically to keep the arm straightened against resistance.

Isolation movements include cable push-downs, lying triceps extensions, and arm extensions behind the back. Examples of compound pressing movements include the push up, the JM press, the bench press and its variants, the military press and dips. A closer grip shifts emphasis to the triceps in these compounds.

Static contraction movements include pullovers, straight-arm pulldowns, and bent-over lateral raises, which are also used to build the deltoids and the latissimus dorsi.

Ruptures of the triceps muscle are rare, and typically only occur in anabolic steroid users.

== Clinical significance ==
The triceps reflex, elicited by hitting the triceps, is often used to test the function of the nerves of the arm. This tests spinal nerves C6 and C7, predominantly C7. This reflex can be tested by abducting the Elbow and Shoulder to 90 degrees, then tapping the tendon with a Reflex hammer near to the Olecranon.

Triceps tendinitis can occur when the muscles are overloaded. It typically takes the form of chronic posterior elbow pain and it worsens with active extension. The condition is normally seen in men between the ages of 30 and 40 who are throwing athletes. It is commonly treated with rest and pain control.

== History ==
=== Etymology ===
It is sometimes called a three-headed muscle (Latin literally three-headed, tri - three, and ceps, from caput - head), because there are three bundles of muscles, each of different origins, joining at the elbow. Though a similarly named muscle, the triceps surae, is found on the lower leg, the triceps brachii is commonly called the triceps.

Historically, the plural form of triceps was tricipites, a form not in general use today; instead, triceps is both singular and plural (i.e., when referring to both arms).

== Other animals ==
In the horse, 84%, 15%, and 3% of the total triceps muscle weight correspond to the long, lateral, and medial heads, respectively.

Many mammals, such as dogs, cattle, and pigs, have a fourth head, the accessory head. It lies between the lateral and medial heads. In humans, the anconeus is sometimes loosely called "the fourth head of the triceps brachii".

== Additional images ==
Animation. Close up.
Long head.
Lateral head.
Medial head.

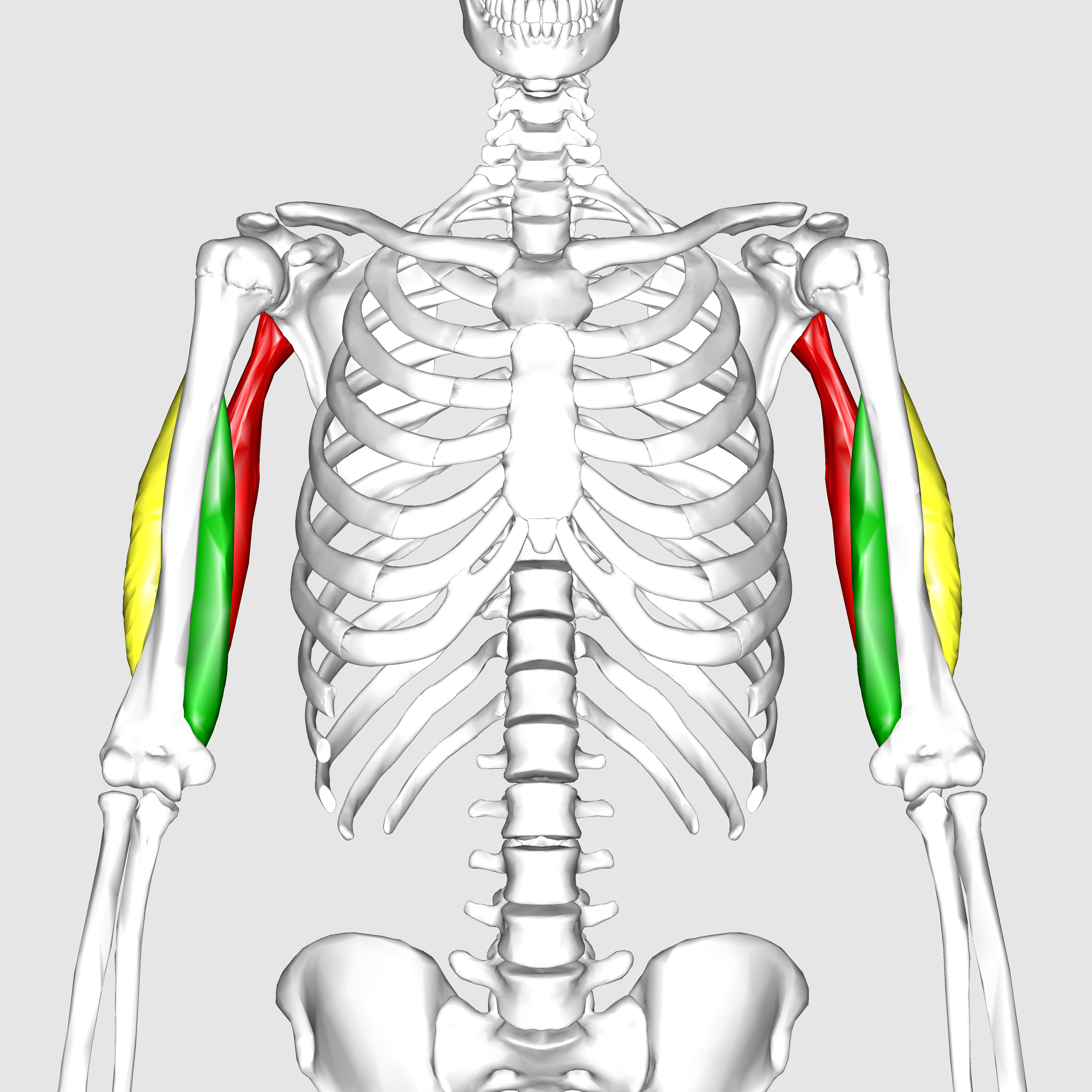
Still image. Anterior view.

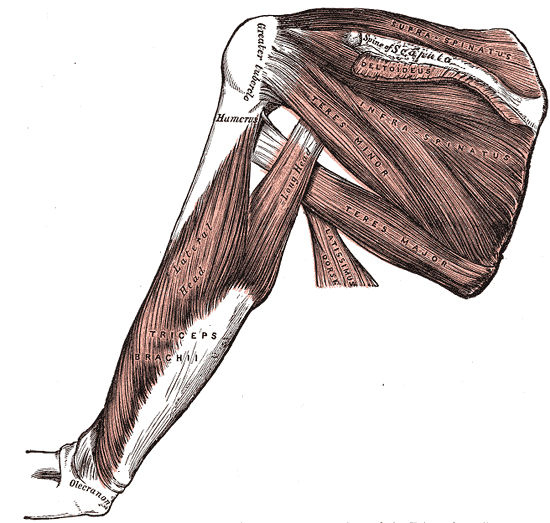
Muscles on the dorsum of the scapula, and the triceps brachii.

Movement of biceps and triceps when the arm is flexing

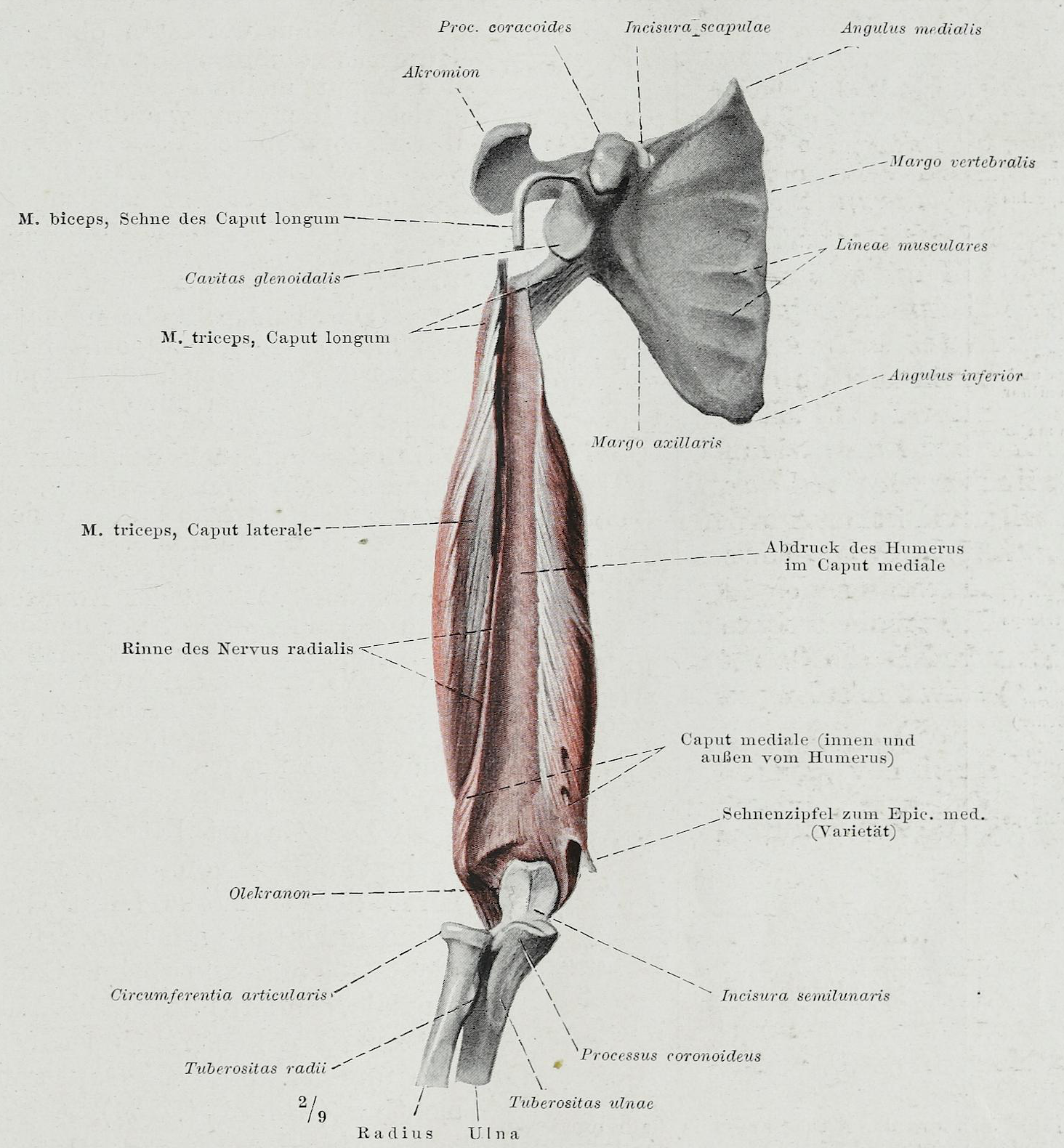
Inner surface of the Musculus triceps brachii after the humerus was taken away. Note the atypical insertion of the Caput mediale at the Epicondylus medialis humeri.

== See also ==
- Biceps
