= Radial recurrent artery =

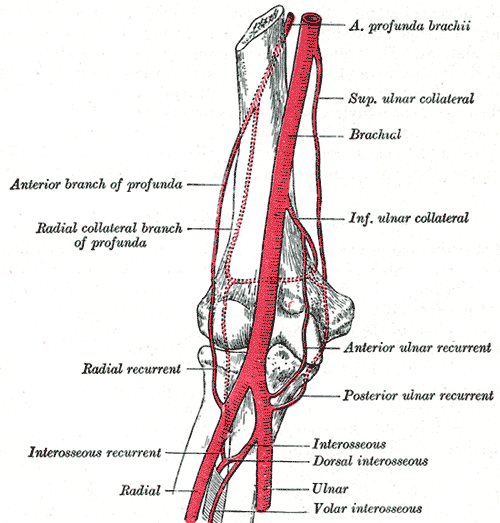
- Diagram of the anastomosis around the elbow-joint. (Radial recurrent labeled at center left.)

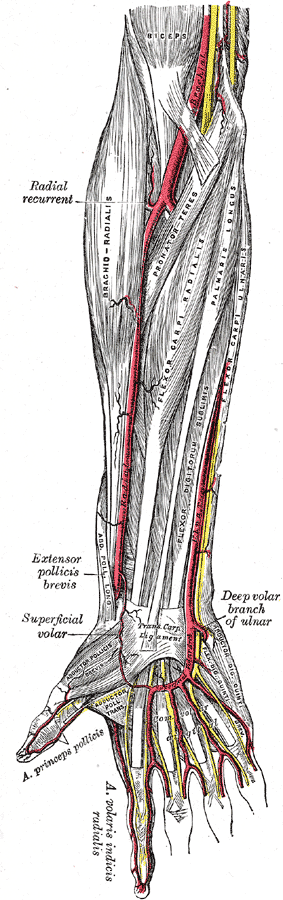
- The radial and ulnar arteries. (Radial recurrent labeled at center left.)

Details
- Source: Radial artery

Identifiers
- Latin: arteria recurrens radialis
- TA98: A12.2.09.028
- TA2: 4642
- FMA: 22748

The radial recurrent artery arises from the radial artery immediately below the elbow.

It ascends between the branches of the radial nerve, lying on the supinator muscle and then between the brachioradialis muscle and the brachialis muscle, supplying these muscles and the elbow-joint, and inosculating with the terminal part of the profunda brachii.

== Additional images ==
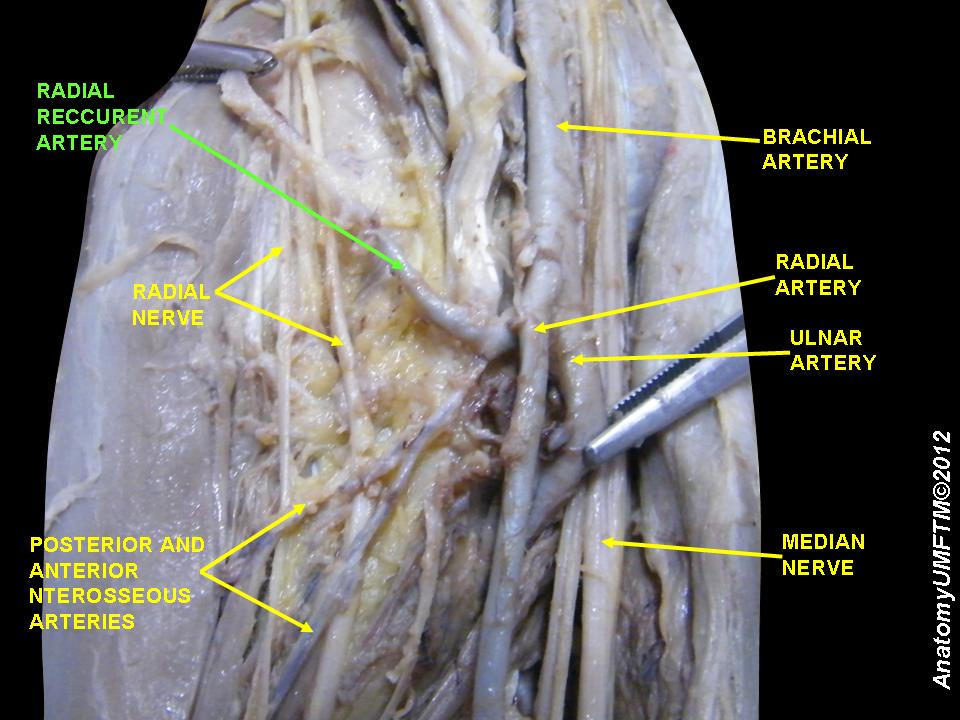
Radial recurrent artery

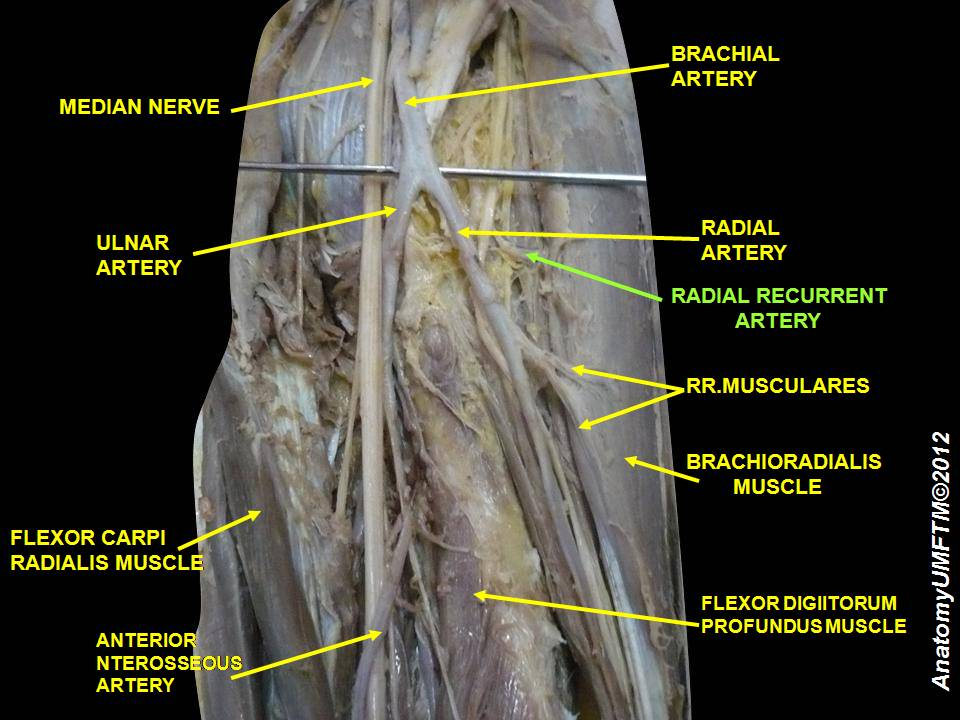
Radial recurrent artery

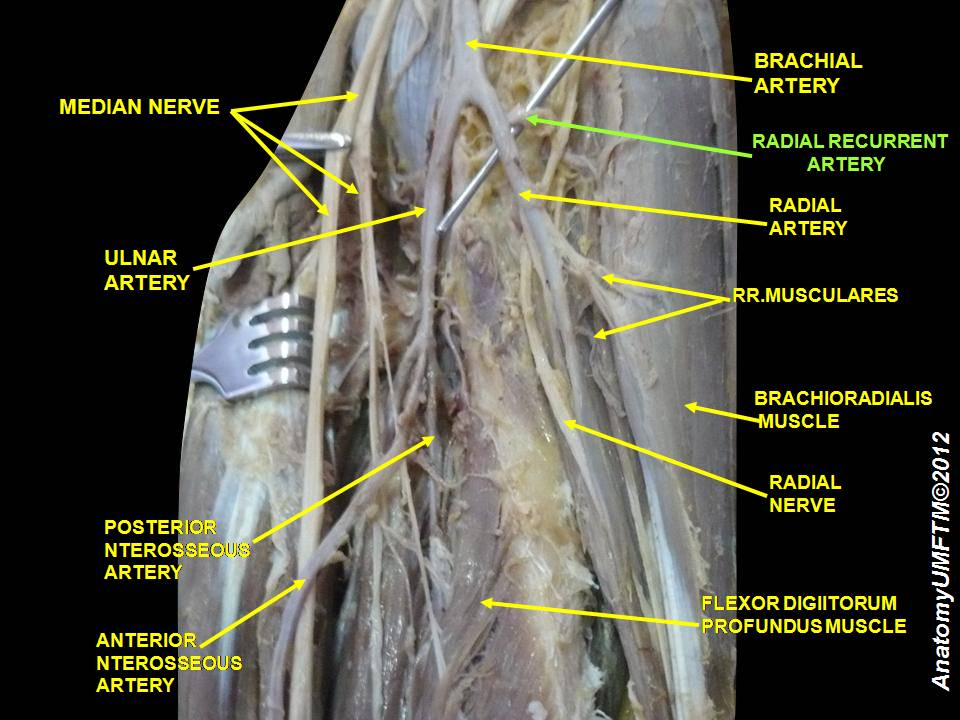
Radial recurrent artery
