= Extrinsic extensor muscles of the hand =

Hand muscle group

Muscles of the posterior forearm

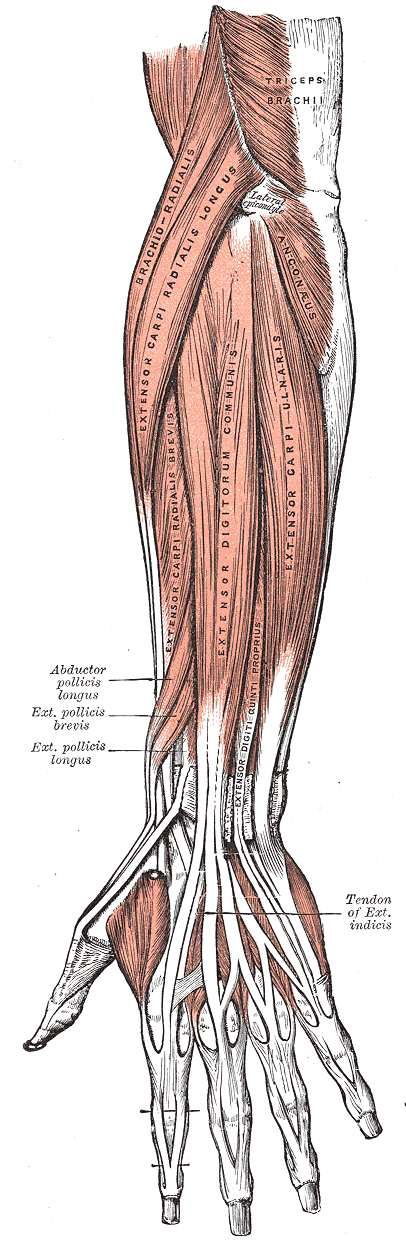
Superficial

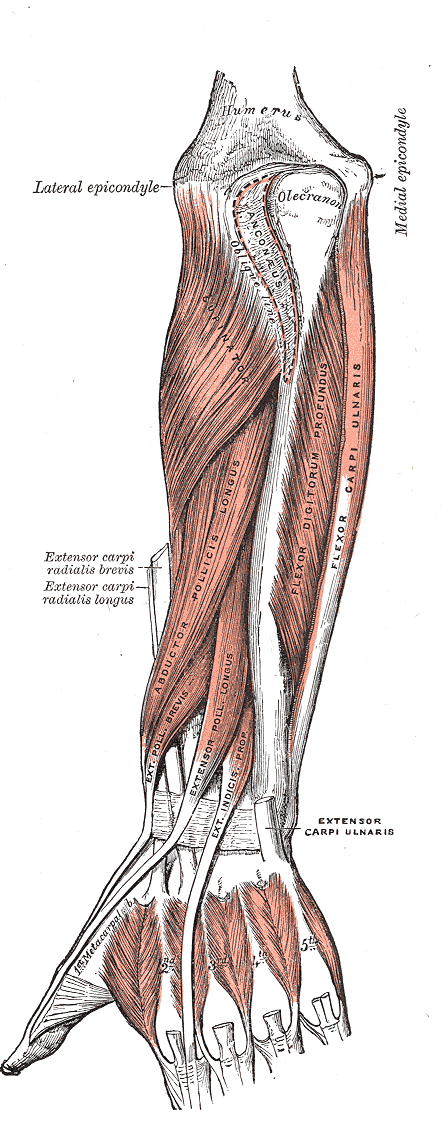
Deep

The extrinsic extensor muscles of the hand are located in the back of the forearm and have long tendons connecting them to bones in the hand, where they exert their action. Extrinsic denotes their location outside the hand. Extensor denotes their action which is to extend, or open flat, joints in the hand. They include the extensor carpi radialis longus (ECRL), extensor carpi radialis brevis (ECRB), extensor digitorum (ED), extensor digiti minimi (EDM), extensor carpi ulnaris (ECU), abductor pollicis longus (APL), extensor pollicis brevis (EPB), extensor pollicis longus (EPL), and extensor indicis (EI).

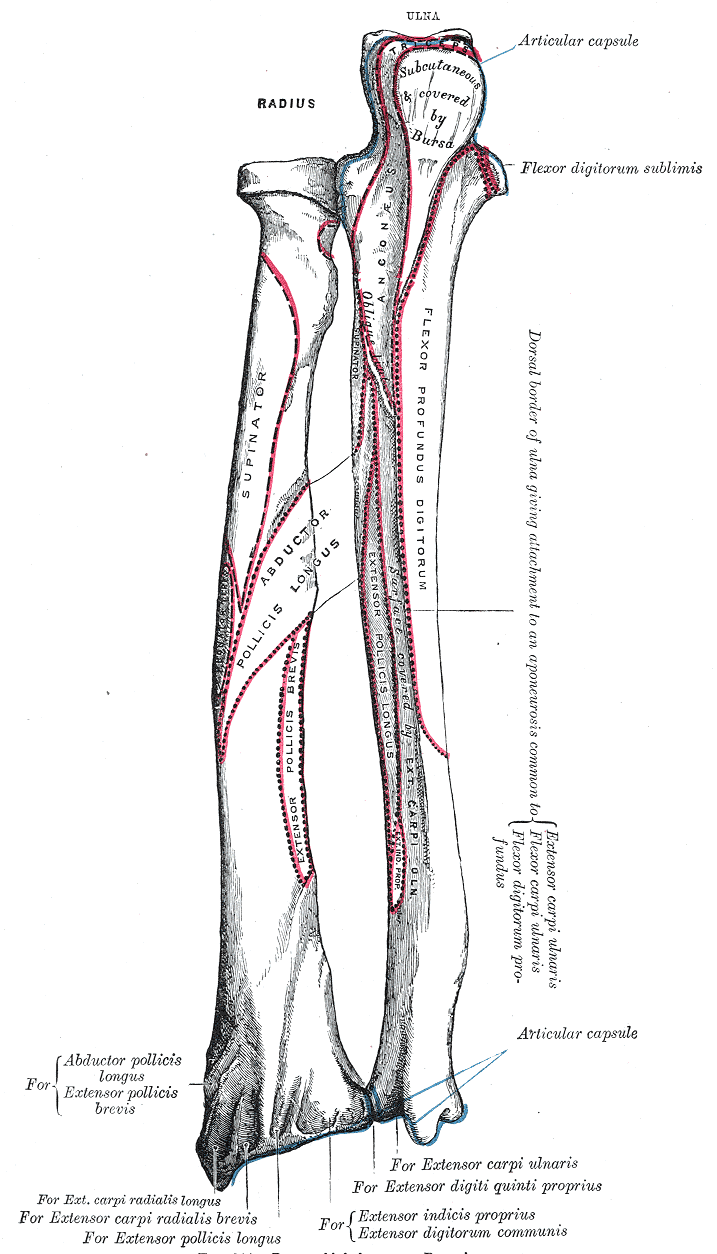
Origins

== Origin ==
The extensor carpi radialis longus (ECRL) has the most proximal origin of the extrinsic hand extensors. It originates just distal to the brachioradialis at the lateral supracondylar ridge of the humerus, the lateral intermuscular septum, and by a few fibers at the lateral epicondyle of the humerus. Distal to this, the extensor carpi radialis brevis (ECRB), extensor digitorum, extensor digiti minimi, and extensor carpi ulnaris (ECU) originate from the lateral epicondyle via the common extensor tendon. The ECRB has additional origins from the radial collateral ligament, the ECU from the dorsal border of the ulna (shared with the flexor carpi ulnaris and flexor digitorum profundus), and all four also originate from various fascia. Moving distally, there are the abductor pollicis longus (APL), extensor pollicis brevis (EPB), extensor pollicis longus (EPL), and extensor indicis (EI). The APL originates from the lateral part of the dorsal surface of the body of the ulna below the insertion of the anconeus and from the middle third of the dorsal surface of the body of the radius. The EPB arises from the radius distal to the APL and from the dorsal surface of the radius. The EPL arises from the dorsal surface of the ulna and the EI from the distal third of the dorsal part of the body of ulna. The APL, EPB, EPL, and EI all have an additional origin at the interosseus membrane.

== Course ==
The ECRL and ECRB, (with the brachioradialis) form the lateral compartment. Their muscle fibers end at the upper third and the mid forearm respectively, continuing as flat tendons along the lateral border of the radius, beneath the APL and EPB. They then pass beneath the extensor retinaculum and dorsal carpal ligament, where they lie in a groove on the back of the radius, immediately behind the styloid process, and continue into the second tendon compartment. The ED divides into four tendons which, with the EI tendons, go through the fourth tendon compartment of the dorsal carpal ligament. On the back of the hand, the ED tendons diverge to follow the fingers and the EI tendon joins the ulnar side of one of the ED tendons along the back of the index finger. The EDM takes a similar course as the EI except it follows the ED tendon along the little finger. The ECU crosses from the lateral to the medial side of the forearm. The APL and EPB pass obliquely down and lateral, ending in tendons which run through a groove on the lateral side of the lower end of the radius. The EPL tendon passes through the third compartment and lies in a narrow, oblique groove on the back of the lower end of the radius.

== Extensor digitorum tendons ==
The ED tendons are more complex in their course. Opposite the metacarpophalangeal joint each tendon is bound by fasciculi to the collateral ligaments and serves as the dorsal ligament of this joint; after having crossed the joint, it spreads out into a broad aponeurosis, which covers the dorsal surface of the first phalanx and is reinforced, in this situation, by the tendons of the Interossei and Lumbricalis.

Opposite the first interphalangeal joints this aponeurosis divides into three slips; an intermediate and two collateral: the former is inserted into the base of the second phalanx; and the two collateral, which are continued onward along the sides of the second phalanx, unite by their contiguous margins, and are inserted into the dorsal surface of the last phalanx. As the tendons cross the interphalangeal joints, they furnish them with dorsal ligaments. The tendon to the index finger is accompanied by the EI, which lies on its ulnar side. On the back of the hand, the tendons to the middle, ring, and little fingers are connected by two obliquely placed bands, one from the third tendon passing downward and lateralward to the second tendon, and the other passing from the same tendon downward and medialward to the fourth.

Occasionally the first tendon is connected to the second by a thin transverse band. Collectively, these are known as the sagittal bands; they serve to maintain the central alignment of the extensor tendons over the metacarpal head, thus increasing the available leverage. Injuries (such as by an external flexion force during active extension) may allow the tendon to dislocate into the intermetacarpal space; the extensor tendon then acts as a flexor and the finger may no longer be actively extended. This may be corrected surgically by using a slip of the extensor tendon to replace the damaged ligamentous band

== Anatomical snuff box ==
The EPL tendon crosses obliquely the tendons of the ECRL and ECRB, and is separated from the EPB by a triangular interval, the anatomical snuff box, in which the radial artery is found.

== Insertion and action ==
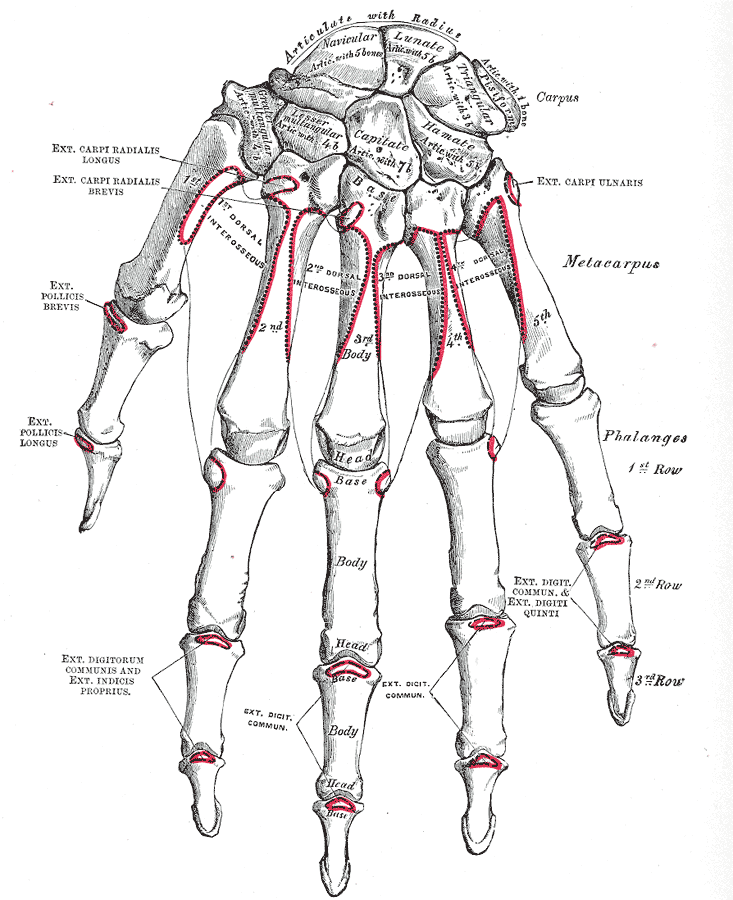
Insertions

The ECRL inserts into the dorsal surface of the base of the second metacarpal bone on its radial side to extend and abduct the wrist. The ECRB inserts into the lateral dorsal surface of the base of the third metacarpal bone, with a few fibres inserting into the medial dorsal surface of the second metacarpal bone, also to extend and abduct the wrist. The ED inserts into the middle and distal phalanges to extend the fingers and wrist. Opposite the head of the second metacarpal bone, the EI joins the ulnar side of the ED tendon to extend the index finger. The EDM has a similar role for the little finger. The ECU inserts at the base of the 5th metacarpal to extend and adduct the wrist. The APL inserts into the radial side of the base of the first metacarpal bone to abduct the thumb at the carpometacarpal joint and may continue to abduct the wrist. The EPB inserts into the base of the first phalanx of the thumb to extend and abduct the thumb at the carpometacarpal and MCP joints. The EPL inserts on the base of the distal phalanx of the thumb. It uses the dorsal tubercle on the radius as fulcrum to help the EPB with its action as well as extending the distal phalanx of the thumb. Because the index finger and little finger have separate extensors, these fingers can be moved more independently than the other fingers.

== Neurovascular supply ==
The ECU is supplied by the ulnar artery. The APL, EPB, EPL, EI, ED, and EDM are supplied by the Posterior interosseous artery, a branch of the ulnar artery. The ECRL and ECRB receive blood from the radial artery.

The ECRL is supplied by the radial nerve and the ECRB by its deep branch. The remaining extrinsic hand extensors are supplied by the posterior interosseus nerve, another branch of the radial nerve.

== Summary table ==
Muscle	Origin	Insertion	Artery	Nerve	Action	Antagonist	Gray's
Extensor carpi radialis longus	lateral supracondylar ridge	2nd metacarpal, base	radial	radial	extends, abducts wrist	FCRM	s125p452
Extensor carpi radialis brevis	common extensor tendon	3rd metacarpal, base	radial	radial nerve, deep branch	extends, abducts wrist	FCRM	s125p452
Extensor digitorum	common extensor tendon	extensor expansion of 2nd–5th middle, distal phalanges	posterior interosseus	posterior interosseus	extends fingers, wrist	FDS, FDP	s125p451
Extensor digiti minimi	common extensor tendon	extensor expansion, base of proximal phalanx, little finger	posterior interosseus	posterior interosseus	extends little finger at all joints	FDMB	s125p451
Extensor carpi ulnaris	common extensor tendon, ulna	5th metacarpal, base	ulnar	posterior interosseus	extends, adducts wrist	FCU	s125p454
Abductor pollicis longus	ulna, radius, interosseous membrane	first metacarpal, base	posterior interosseus	posterior interosseus	abducts, extends thumb	AP	s125p455
Extensor pollicis brevis	ulna, radius, interosseous membrane	proximal phalanx, thumb	posterior interosseus	posterior interosseus	extends thumb at MCP joint	FPL, FPB	s125p455
Extensor pollicis longus	ulna, interosseous membrane	thumb, distal phalanx	posterior interosseus	posterior interosseus	extends thumb at MCP and IP joint	FPL, FPB	s125p455
Extensor indicis	ulna, interosseous membrane	index finger, extensor hood	posterior interosseus	posterior interosseus	extends index finger, wrist		s125p455

== See also ==
- Extensor digitorum reflex
