= Extensor pollicis et indicis communis muscle =

Accessory muscle in the forearm

Extensor pollicis et indicis communis
- Extensor pollicis et indicis communis muscle

Details
- Origin: Posterior distal third of ulna and interosseous membrane
- Insertion: thumb (extensor hood) and index finger (extensor hood)
- Artery: posterior interosseous artery
- Nerve: posterior interosseous nerve
- Actions: extends thumb and index finger

Identifiers
- Latin: Musculus extensor pollicis et indicis communis

In human anatomy, the extensor pollicis et indicis communis is an accessory muscle in the posterior compartment of forearm. It was first described in 1863. The muscle has a prevalence from 0.5% to 4%.

== Structure ==
The structure of the extensor pollicis et indicis communis resembles both the characteristics of the extensor pollicis longus and the extensor indicis proprius. It originates from the distal end of ulna. Its tendon passes through the extensor retinaculum in the fourth extensor compartment, splits into two and inserts to both thumb and index finger. The presence of the extensor pollicis et indicis communis, on the other hand, may impair thumb adduction.

It was reported as an unusual juncturae tendinum, a tendinous connection between tendon of the extensor pollicis longus and tendon of the extensor digitorum communis to the index finger. It was also identified as a slip of the extensor indicis proprius to the extensor pollicis longus in an Indian cadaver.

== In other animals ==
In many species of New World monkeys, a muscle similar to the extensor pollicis et indicis communis was found to be a normal anatomy rather than an anatomical variation. It is described as the extensor pollicis et indicis longus. In chimpanzees and humans, however, the muscle is well separated becoming the extensor pollicis longus and the extensor indicis proprius.

== See also ==
- List of anatomical variations
- Extensor pollicis longus
- Extensor indicis proprius
