= Posterior compartment of the forearm =

Region of the forearm containing 12 muscles for extending the wrist and digits

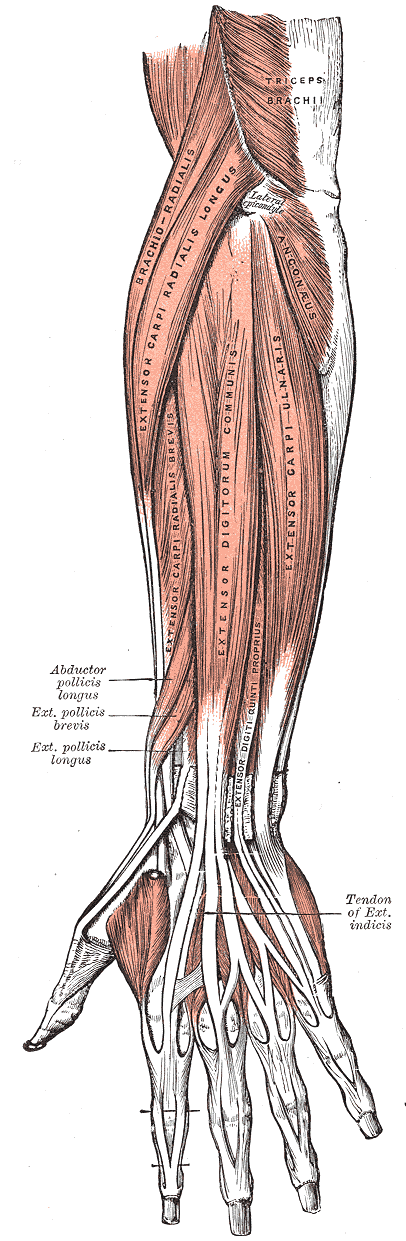
- Extensor compartment of the forearm and hand

Details
- System: Musculoskeletal system
- Artery: Radial artery, radial recurrent artery, profunda brachii, posterior interosseous artery
- Nerve: Radial nerve, posterior interosseous nerve

Identifiers
- Latin: compartimentum antebrachii posterius
- TA98: A04.6.01.007
- TA2: 2494
- FMA: 38411

The posterior compartment of the forearm (or extensor compartment) contains twelve muscles which primarily extend the wrist and digits. It is separated from the anterior compartment by the interosseous membrane between the radius and ulna.

== Structure ==
=== Muscles ===
There are generally twelve muscles in the posterior compartment of the forearm, which can be further divided into superficial, intermediate, and deep. Most of the muscles in the superficial and the intermediate layers share a common origin which is the outer part of the elbow, the lateral epicondyle of humerus. The deep muscles arise from the distal part of the ulna and the surrounding interosseous membrane.

The brachioradialis, flexor of the elbow, is unusual in that it is located in the posterior compartment, but it is actually a muscle of flexor / anterior compartment of the forearm. The anconeus, assisting in extension of the elbow joint, is by some considered part of the posterior compartment of the arm.

The majority of muscles found in the posterior compartment are extrinsic, meaning that their origin has some distance from the part moved. The brachioradialis and the anconeus are considered intrinsic muscles because they both arise within the forearm and they both move the forearm.

Level	Muscle	Extrinsic/Intrinsic	Innervation
superficial	brachioradialis	intrinsic	radial nerve
superficial	extensor carpi radialis longus	extrinsic	radial nerve
superficial	extensor carpi radialis brevis	extrinsic	radial nerve (deep branch)
superficial	extensor carpi ulnaris	extrinsic	radial nerve (as posterior interosseous nerve)
superficial	anconeus	intrinsic	radial nerve
intermediate	extensor digitorum	extrinsic	radial nerve (as posterior interosseous nerve)
intermediate	extensor digiti minimi	extrinsic	radial nerve (as posterior interosseous nerve)
deep	abductor pollicis longus	extrinsic	radial nerve (as posterior interosseous nerve)
deep	extensor pollicis longus	extrinsic	radial nerve (as posterior interosseous nerve)
deep	extensor pollicis brevis	extrinsic	radial nerve (as posterior interosseous nerve)
deep	extensor indicis	extrinsic	radial nerve (as posterior interosseous nerve)
deep	supinator	intrinsic	radial nerve (deep branch)

=== Extensor tendon compartments ===
Extensor tendons pass through the extensor retinaculum at wrist joint in 6 synovial sheaths, also referred to compartments.

The supinator and the anconeus are the two extensor muscles in the posterior compartment of the forearm that do not pass through wrist extensor compartments.

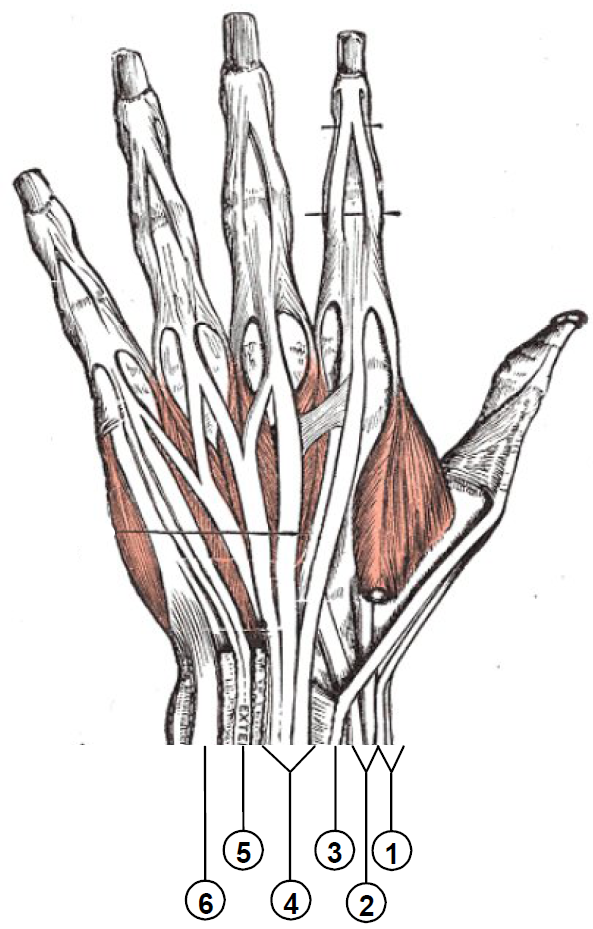

1. The first compartment locating the most radial is occupied by the extensor pollicis brevis and the abductor pollicis longus to insert to the thumb.
2. The second compartment is occupied by the two radial wrist extensors, the extensor carpi radialis longus and the extensor carpi radialis brevis.
3. The third compartment exclusively accommodates the extensor pollicis longus, which hooks around Lister's tubercle of radius and inserts to the thumb.
4. The fourth compartment is the largest of all. It is occupied by the extensors of the digits, the extensor digitorum communis and the extensor indicis proprius. The extensor indicis proprius usually runs and inserts onto the ulnar side of the extensor digitorum communis of the index finger.
5. The fifth compartment is occupied by the extensor digiti minimi, the extensor of the little finger.
6. The extensor carpi ulnaris passes through the sixth compartment to insert to the base of the fifth metacarpal bone.

=== Innervation ===
The muscles of the posterior compartment of the forearm are innervated by the radial nerve and its branches. The radial nerve arises from the posterior cord of the plexus. The somatomotor fibers of the radial nerve branch from the main radial nerve at the level of the radial groove of the humerus.

=== Development ===
In the early stage of development, the extensor precursor divides into 3 layers namely, superficial layer, radial layer and deep layer. The superficial group develops to become the extensor digitorum communis, the extensor carpi ulnaris and the extensor digiti minimi. The radial layer forms the extensor carpi radialis longus, the extensor carpi radialis brevis and the brachioradialis. The deep layer differentiates to become the abductor pollicis longus, the extensor pollicis longus and the extensor pollicis brevis.

Phylogenetic origin	Embryologic origin	Representatives in humans
Brachioantebrachial group	Radial layer	Brachioradialis
		Extensor carpi radialis longus
		Extensor carpi radialis brevis
		Supinator
	Superficial layer	Extensor digitorum communis
		Extensor carpi ulnaris
		Extensor digiti minimi
Antebrachiomanual group	Deep layer (radial)	Extensor pollicis brevis
		Abductor pollicis longus
	Deep layer (ulnar)	Extensor pollicis longus
		Extensor indicis proprius
		Extensor digitorum brevis manus
Manual group	-	-

=== Variations ===
The deep layer of the precursor extensor mass is known to be phylogenetically unstable and is undergoing evolution as high variability is seen in non-human primates. In humans, anomalous or additional muscles can be seen in small portion of population.

Anomalous muscles in human extensor compartment are listed as follow:

- Extensor medii proprius
- Extensor indicis et medii communis
- Extensor pollicis et indicis communis
- Extensor carpi radialis tertius
- Extensor digitorum brevis manus

== Clinical significance ==
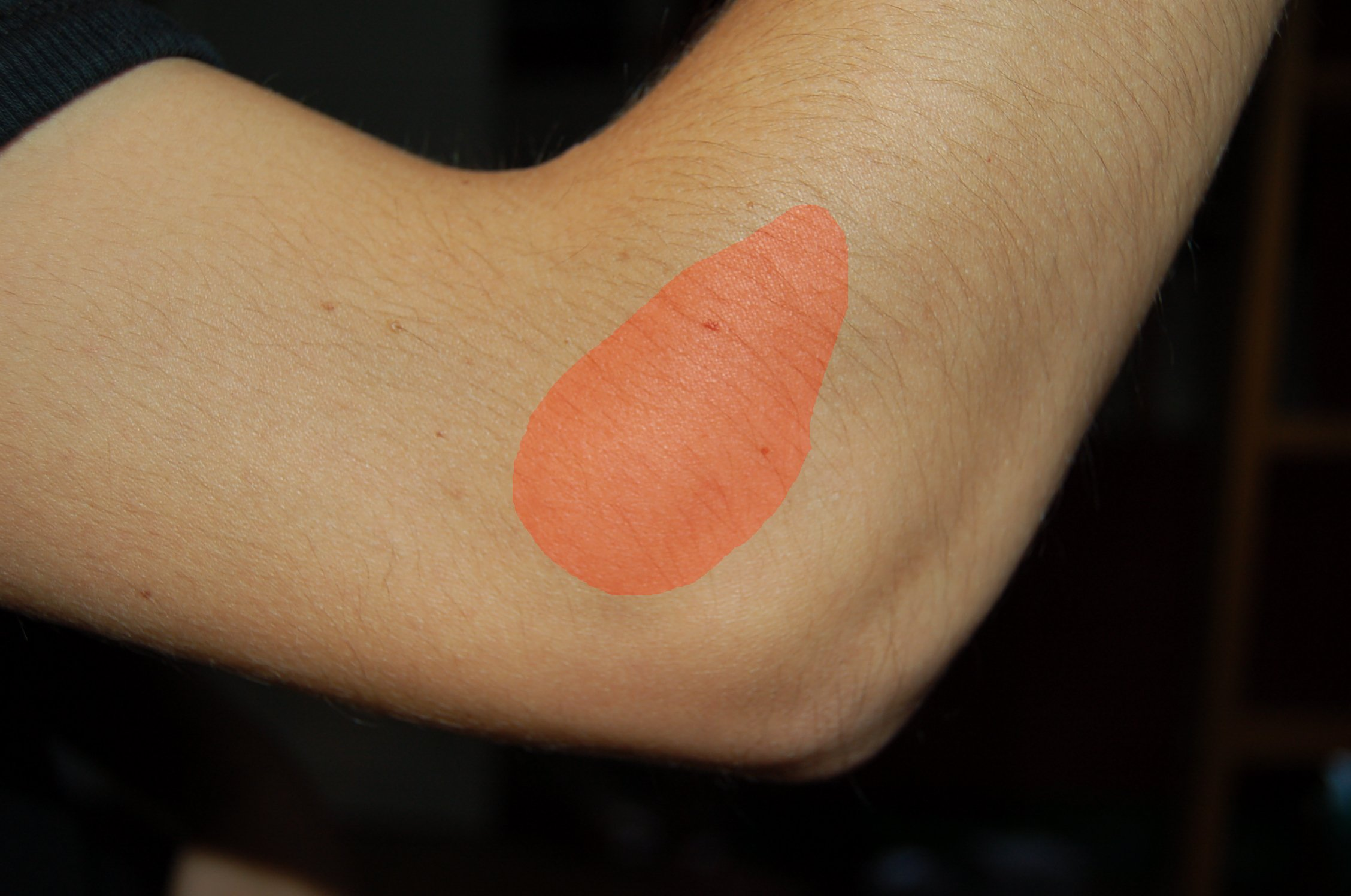
Outer part of the elbow (lateral epicondyle) where tennis elbow occurs

=== Tennis elbow ===
Tennis elbow or lateral epicondylitis is a chronic or an acute inflammation of the tendons that arise from the outer part of the elbow. The affected tendons are the tendons of extensor muscles which originate from the lateral epicondyle of humerus. It is caused by the repetitive movements and overuse. It damages the tendons which results in pain and tenderness on the outer part of the elbow.

=== De Quervain's syndrome ===
De Quervain's syndrome is a medical condition when the synovial sheath surrounding tendons in the first extensor tendon compartment becomes inflamed, so called tenosynovitis. The tendons of the abductor pollicis longus and the extensor pollicis brevis run narrower due to the thickening of the synovial sheath, which causes pain when extending and moving the thumb outward.

=== Fourth compartment syndrome ===
The presence of an additional tendon may result in a condition called fourth compartment syndrome. Supernumerary tendons are common in the fourth extensor tendon compartment. Supernumerary tendons can refer to the additional tendons of normal structures or tendons of rare anatomical variants such as the extensor medii proprius or the extensor digitorum brevis manus. The increased pressure in the synovial sheath is known to directly or indirectly compress the posterior interosseous nerve of radial nerve. Also, the extra pressure causes synovitis which results in pain in the dorsal part of the wrist.

=== Misdiagnosis of rare anatomical variants ===
Anatomical variants are often encountered in the extensor compartment of the forearm. Clinical expressions of the extensor digitorum brevis manus are often mistaken for a ganglion, cyst or tumour.

== In other animals ==
In the superfamily hominoidea or apes, configurations of the muscles of the posterior compartment of the forearm share similar characteristics. However, the anconeus is usually not present in the hylobates (gibbons). Also, the extensor pollicis brevis is only present in the genus homo (humans) and the genus hylobates because the extensor pollicis brevis and the abductor pollicis longus exist as a single muscle in other genera.

== See also ==
- Anterior compartment of the forearm
- Forearm
- Upper limb

== Additional images ==
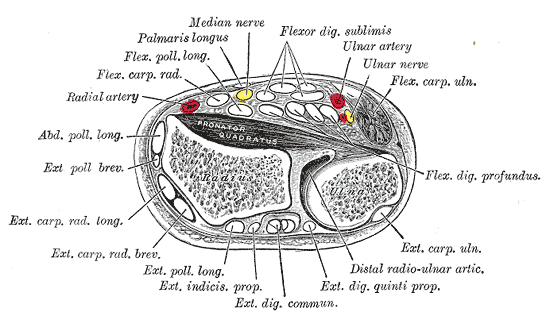
Transverse section across distal ends of radius and ulna.

Transverse section across the wrist and digits.
