= Mucous sheaths on back of wrist =

Tissue covering tendons in the wrist

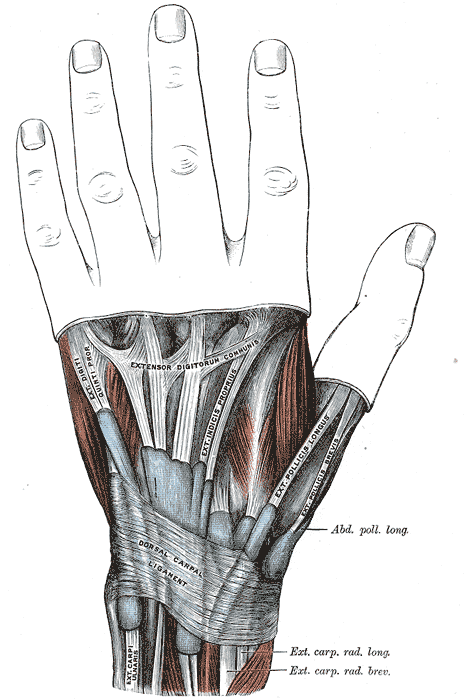
- The mucous sheaths of the tendons on the back of the wrist.

The mucous sheaths of the tendons on the back of the wrist are protective coverings for tendons in the wrist. Between the dorsal carpal ligament and the bones six compartments are formed for the passage of tendons, each compartment having a separate mucous sheath. One is found in each of the following positions:

1. on the lateral side of the radial styloid process, for the tendons of the Abductor pollicis longus and Extensor pollicis brevis;
2. behind the styloid process, for the tendons of the Extensores carpi radialis longus and brevis;
3. about the middle of the dorsal surface of the radius, for the tendon of the Extensor pollicis longus;
4. to the medial side of the latter, for the tendons of the Extensor digitorum communis and Extensor indicis proprius;
5. opposite the interval between the radius and ulna, for the Extensor digiti quinti proprius;
6. between the head and styloid process of the ulna, for the tendon of the Extensor carpi ulnaris.

The sheaths lining these compartments extends from above the dorsal carpal ligament.

- Those for the tendons of Abductor pollicis longus, Extensor brevis pollicis, Extensores carpi radialis, and Extensor carpi ulnaris stop immediately proximal to the bases of the metacarpal bones
- The sheaths for Extensor communis digitorum, Extensor indicis proprius, and Extensor digiti quinti proprius are prolonged to the junction of the proximal and intermediate thirds of the metacarpus.
