= Extensor medii proprius muscle =

Variant muscle of the forearm

Extensor medii proprius
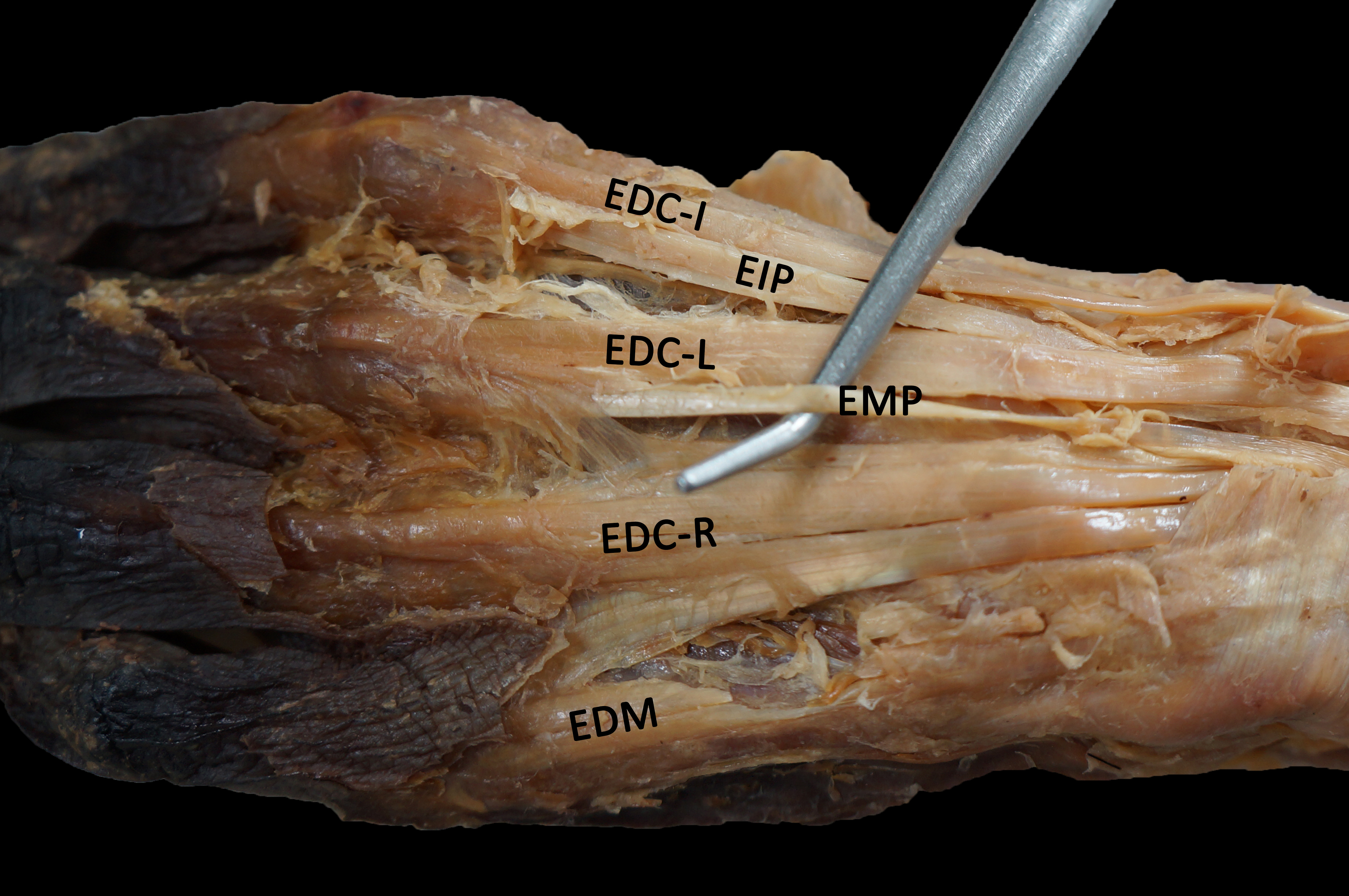
- Extensor medii proprius (EMP)

Details
- Origin: posterior distal third of ulna and interosseous membrane
- Insertion: middle finger (extensor hood)
- Artery: posterior interosseous artery
- Nerve: posterior interosseous nerve
- Actions: extends middle finger

Identifiers
- Latin: musculus extensor digiti medii proprius

The extensor medii proprius (so called the extensor digiti medii) is a rare anatomical variant in the extensor compartment of the forearm. The aberrant muscle is analogous to the extensor indicis with the insertion being the middle finger instead of the index finger.

== Structure ==
The extensor medii proprius originates from the distal third of ulna near the extensor indicis and the adjacent interosseous membrane. It passes through the fourth extensor compartment along with the extensor indicis and the extensor digitorum. It inserts to the extensor expansion of the middle finger usually on the ulnar side of the tendon of the extensor digitorum of the middle finger, though, insertion deep to the extensor digirorum tendon was seen. Insertion to the fibrous tissue proximal to the metacarpophalangeal joint of the middle finger was also reported.

=== Prevalence ===
The reported incidence of the extensor medii proprius in cadaveric dissections ranges from 0% to 12%. Meta-analysis showed that the prevalence of this muscle was significantly higher in North American and Japanese populations than European and Indian populations.

== Function ==
The extensor medii proprius extends the middle finger. The presence of this anomalous muscle results in a more independent movement of the middle finger.

== Clinical significance ==
The extensor medii proprius is unlikely to cause symptoms. However, awareness of this anomalous muscle may help physicians for identification and for proper planning of surgery.

== Additional images ==
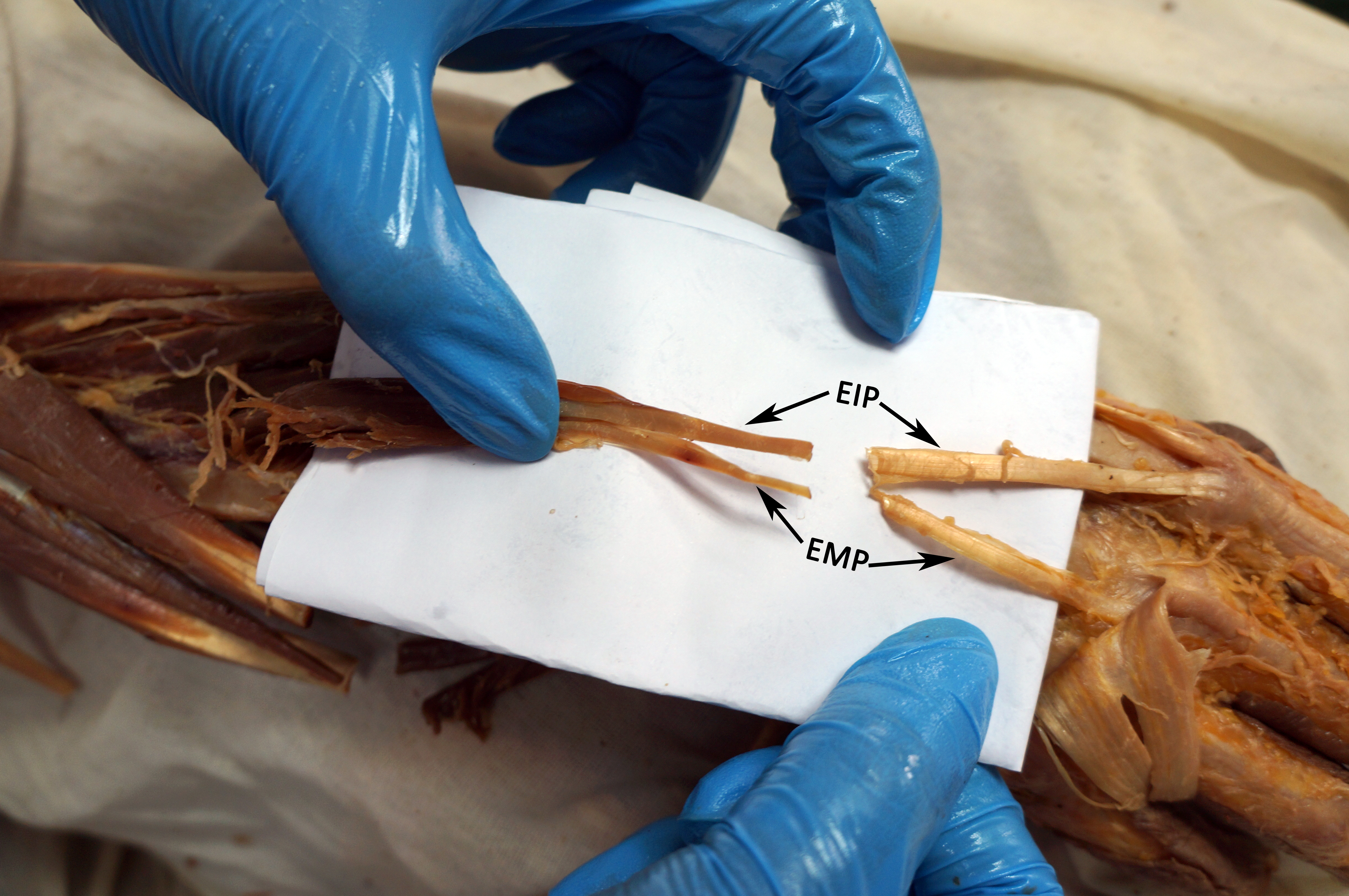
Extensor indicis proprius (EIP) and extensor medii proprius (EMP)

== See also ==
- Extensor digitorum
- Extensor indicis
- Extensor indicis et medii communis
- List of anatomical variations
