= Digitorum brevis muscle =

Digitorum brevis muscle may refer to:

- Extensor digitorum brevis manus
- Extensor digitorum brevis muscle
- Flexor digitorum brevis muscle
