= Extensor digitorum brevis manus muscle =

Muscle on the back of the hand

Extensor digitorum brevis manus

Details
- System: Muscular system
- Artery: Anterior interosseous artery
- Nerve: Posterior interosseous nerve

Identifiers
- Latin: Musculus extensor digitorum brevis manus

Extensor digitorum brevis manus is an extra or accessory muscle on the backside (dorsum) of the hand. It was first described by Albinus in 1758. The muscles lies in the fourth extensor compartment of the wrist, and is relatively rare. It has a prevalence of 4% in the general population according to a meta-analysis. This muscle is commonly misdiagnosed as a ganglion cyst, synovial nodule or cyst.

== Structure ==
The extensor digitorum brevis manus usually originates from the dorsal aspect (backside) of the wrist, either from the joint capsule, the distal end (the most distant end) of the radius, the metacarpal, or from the radiocarpal ligament in the area of the fourth extensor compartment. Many variations of the muscle have been described in the literature. It could have up to four tendons with a single tendon inserting to the index or the middle finger being the two most common variations. At the insertion the tendon of the extensor digitorum brevis manus often joins the extensor indicis proprius, although it also occurs when the extensor indicis proprius is absent. It was also reported to coexist with the extensor medii proprius, another anatomical variation in the extensor compartment of the hand. The muscle is supplied the posterior interosseous nerve and posterior branch of the anterior interosseous artery.

=== Variation ===
The extensor digitorum brevis manus was found to be present in 4% of the population, and there was no correlation between gender, side or ancestry. it inserted to the index finger and the middle finger in 77% and 23% of the cases, respectively. It occurred bilaterally in 26% the total cases.

=== Development ===
At some point during the embryonic development, the precursor extensor mass differentiates into three layers: radial, superficial, and deep. The extensor digitorum brevis manus may have been originated from the deep layer, a typical location where most of the variations take place. Some authors believe that this muscle may represent a failure of proximal migration of ulnocarpal elements of the extensor muscle mass in humans.

== Functions ==
It extends the index or the middle finger. It is believed to be a substitute for the extension of the index finger when the extensor indicis proprius is absent.

== Clinical significance ==
Only a few clinical cases have been reported among more than 300 clinical and cadaveric dissections. This implies that the presence of this muscle is usually asymptomatic, although the extensor digitorum brevis manus might cause a painful swelling which can potentially be misdiagnosed as other pathology such as synovial cyst and lipoma.

== See also ==
- Extensor indicis proprius muscle
- Extensor medii proprius muscle
- Extensor indicis et medii communis muscle
- List of anatomical variations
