= Extensor digitorum reflex =

Muscular reflex

The extensor digitorum reflex is tested as part of the neurological examination to assess the sensory and motor pathways within the C6 and C7 spinal nerves. It is also known as Braunecker-Effenberg reflex, or BER.

== Testing ==
The test is performed by tapping the extensor digitorum muscle while the fingers are light or half flexed. A sudden contraction of the musculus extensor digitorum and extension of the fingers indicate a normal reflex.

== Absence of reflex ==
An absence of reflex can be an indicator for radiculopathy within the C6 and C7 or neuropathy within the deep branch of the radial nerve.
