= Juncturae tendinum =

Connective tissues linking the tendons which extend the fingers

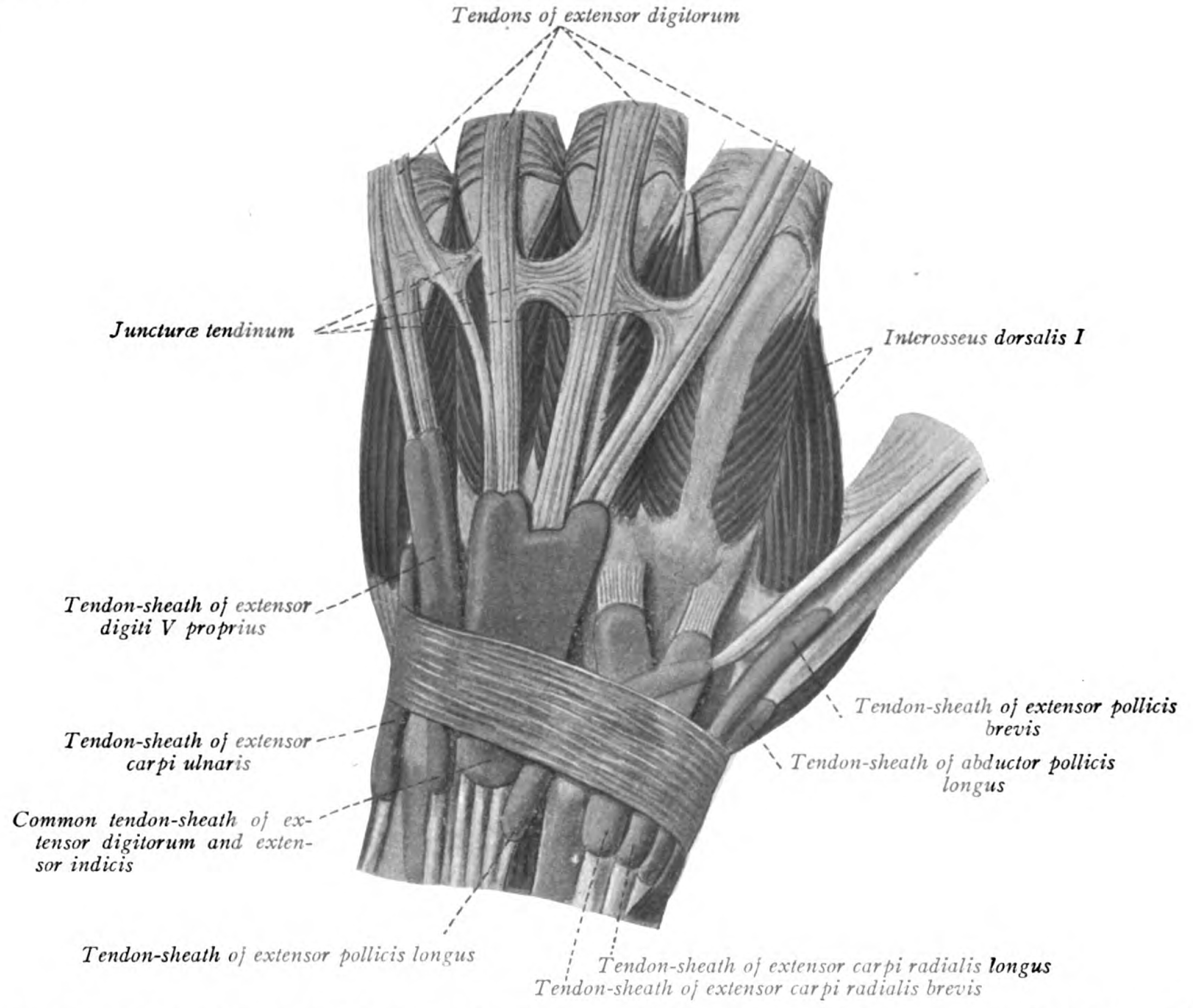
- Juncturae tendinum are seen between the tendons of the extensor digitorum communis.

Details

Identifiers
- Latin: Juncturae tendinum
- TA98: A04.6.02.043
- TA2: 2501

In human anatomy, juncturae tendinum or connexus intertendinei refers to the connective tissues that link the tendons of the extensor digitorum communis, and sometimes, to the tendon of the extensor digiti minimi. Juncturae tendinum are located on the dorsal aspect of the hand in the first, second and third inter-metacarpal spaces proximal to the metacarpophalangeal joint.

== Structure ==
Juncturae tendinum are narrow bands of connective tissues that extend between the tendons of the extensor digitorum communis and the extensor digiti minimi. It is classified into three distinct types (Type 1, 2 and 3) depending on morphology.

- Type 1: This is a thin and filamentous juncturae tendinum. Its shape can either be square, rhomboidal or triangular.
- Type 2: This type is more tendinous and thicker than type 1 juncturae, and it is also located more distal than the type 1.
- Type 3: Type 3 juncturae refers to the slips from the extensor digitorum communis. Type 3 juncture is further divided into subtype 3r and 3y according to its shape, with the subtype 3r being more oblique than the 3y.

=== Histology ===
Histological structure of type 1 consists of tight tissue fibers and loose connective tissues. The surrounding loose fibers are rich in blood vessels with pathways for nerves. Tendinous fibers are rarely found and are in single direction. Type 2 juncturae tendinum is also composed of single direction fibers like type 1, but with thicker bundles. Histological structure of the type 3 juncturae is denser and thicker than type 2 juncturae and tendinous fibers are arranged in two layers. Tendinous fibers of the type 3 show crosswise direction with single direction and oblique bundles. No muscular tissue is observed in any type of the juncturae tendinum.

=== Variations ===
Type 1 juncturae is mostly seen between the index and the middle fingers (second inter metacarpal space). Type 2 juncturae is observed mainly between the middle and the ring fingers (third inter-metacarpal space). Type 3 juncturae tendinum is mostly found between the ring and the little finger (fourth inter-metacarpal space).

Normally, the extensor indicis proprius do not receive any juncture tendinum, but it is rarely seen and the mobility of the index finger is compromised. The absence of the tendon of the extensor digitorum communis to the little finger is associated with the thicker type 3r juncturae tendinum in the fourth intermetacarpal space.

Hirai et al. reported type 1 junturae tendinum between the extensor digiti minimi and the extensor digitorum communis to the ring finger in 6% of the specimens.

== Functions ==
Functionalities of juncturae tendinum include coordinating, force distributing, maintaining the space between the common extensor tendons during the extension of different fingers, and stabilizing the metacarpophalangeal joint. Juncturae tendinum also acts as a compensatory slip for the little finger when the tendon of the extensor digitorum comunis to the little finger is absent. However, the presence of juncturae tendinum may make it more difficult to extend each finger independently.

== Additional image(s) ==
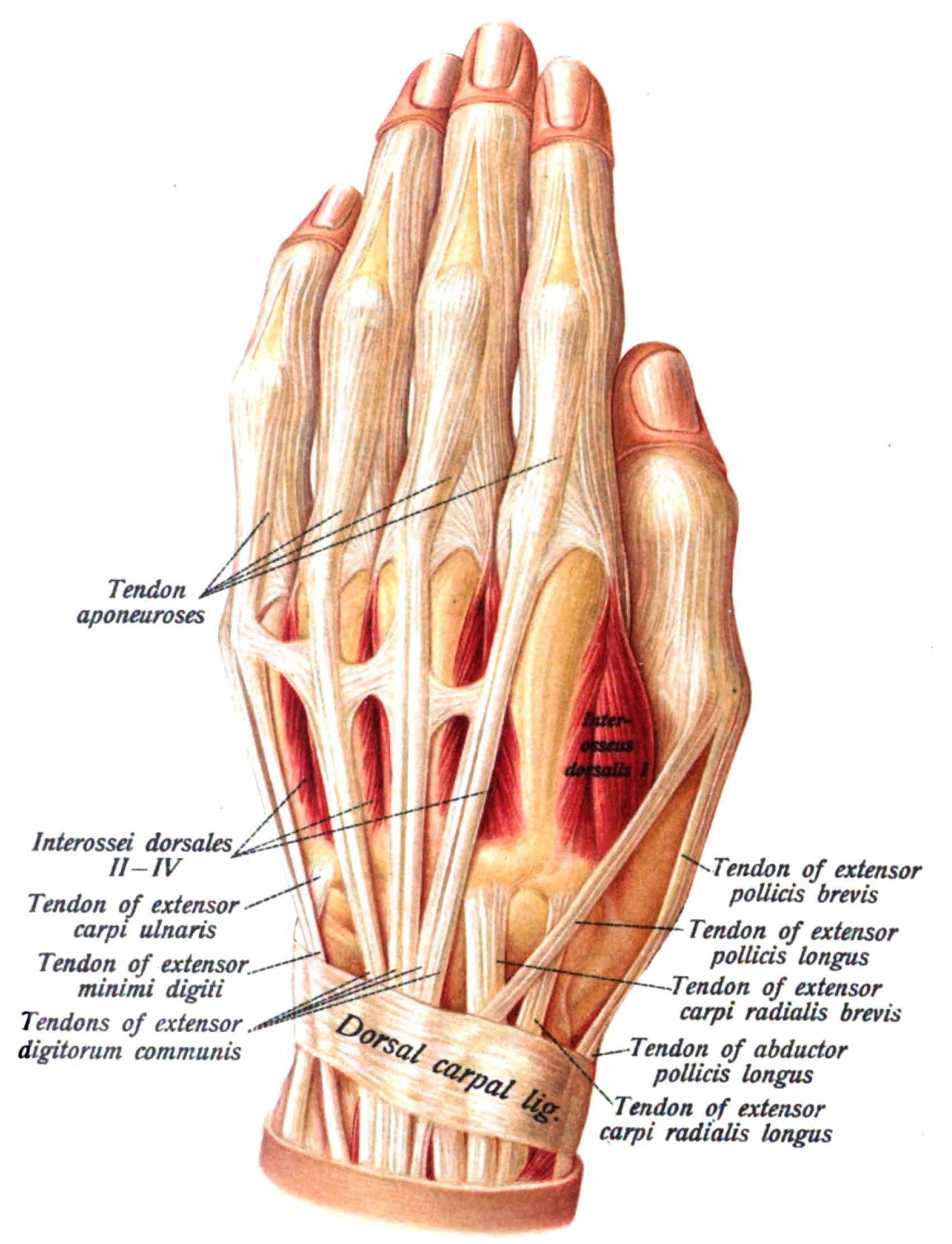
