= Extensor indicis muscle =

Forearm muscle which extends the index finger

Extensor indicis proprius
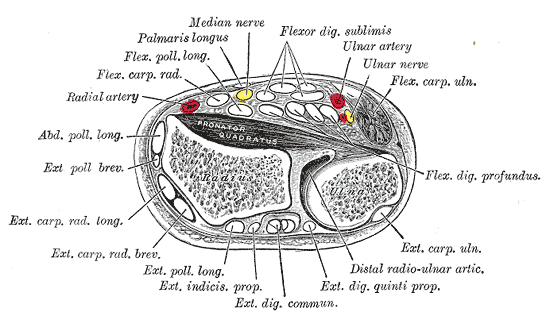
- Transverse section across distal ends of radius and ulna. (Label "Ext. indic. prop." visible at bottom center.)

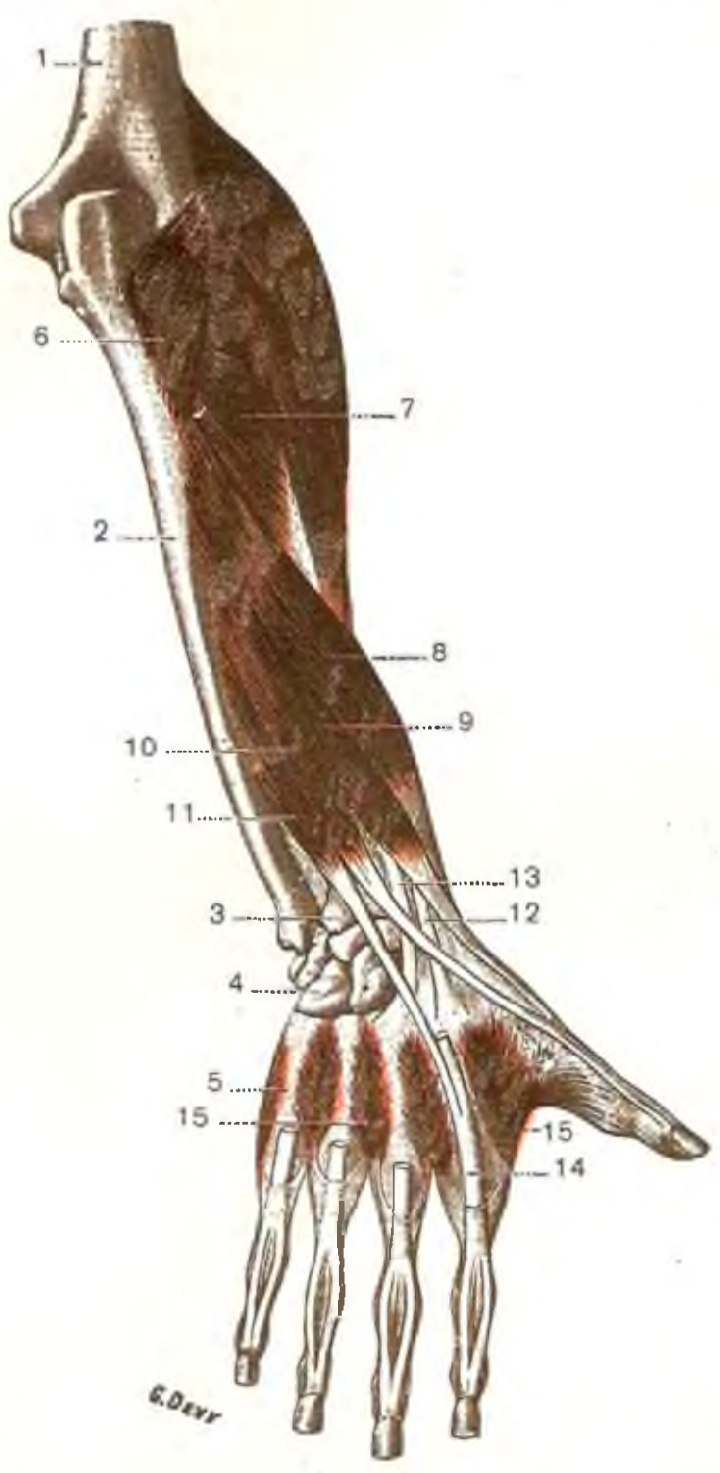
- Posterior aspect of the right forearm and hand. Deep muscles. Extensor indicis muscle is labeled 11. (From Testut's Anatomy.)

Details
- Origin: Posterior distal third of ulna and interosseous membrane
- Insertion: Index finger (extensor hood)
- Artery: Posterior interosseous artery
- Nerve: Posterior interosseous nerve
- Actions: Extends index finger, wrist

Identifiers
- Latin: musculus extensor indicis
- TA98: A04.6.02.052
- TA2: 2515
- FMA: 38524

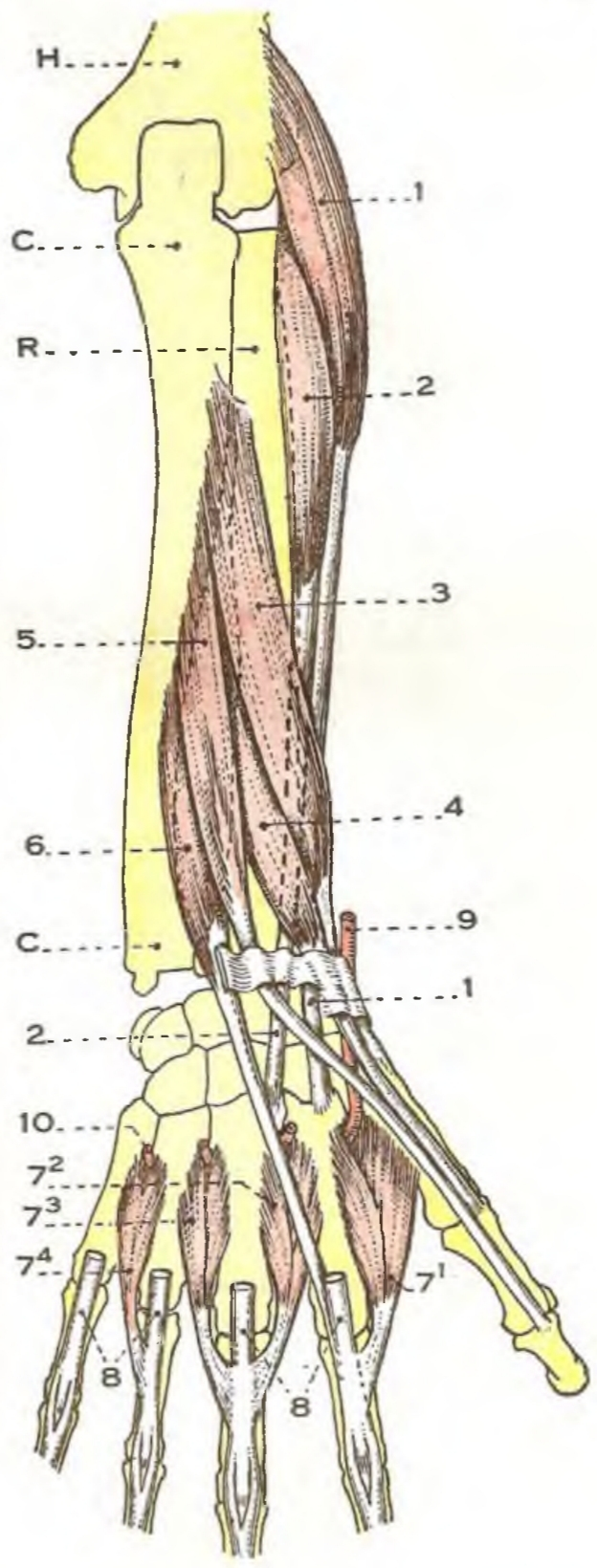
Anatomical illustration depicting several deep muscles of the posterior aspect of the right forearm and hand. The extensor indicis is labeled 6. (From Testut's Anatomy.)

In human anatomy, the extensor indicis (proprius) is a narrow, elongated skeletal muscle in the deep layer of the dorsal forearm, placed medial to, and parallel with, the extensor pollicis longus. Its tendon goes to the index finger, which it extends.

== Structure ==
It arises from the distal third of the dorsal part of the body of the ulna and from the interosseous membrane. It runs through the fourth tendon compartment together with the extensor digitorum, from where it projects into the dorsal aponeurosis of the index finger.

Opposite the head of the second metacarpal bone, it joins the ulnar side of the tendon of the extensor digitorum which belongs to the index finger.

Like the extensor digiti minimi (i.e. the extensor of the little finger), the tendon of the extensor indicis runs and inserts on the ulnar side of the tendon of the common extensor digitorum. The extensor indicis lacks the juncturae tendinum interlinking the tendons of the extensor digitorum on the dorsal side of the hand.

=== Variation ===
The extensor indicis proprius does not show much variation. It exists as a single tendon most of the time. Double tendons of the extensor indicis proprius was also reported.

It is known that the extensor indicis proprius inserts to the index finger on the ulnar side of the extensor digitorum. However, the insertion on the radial side of the common extensor digitorum infrequently seen, namely the extensor indicis radialis. Split tendons of the muscle inserting on both ulnar and the radial side of the common extensor digitorum was also reported.

Anomalous hand extensors including the extensor medii proprius and the extensor indicis et medii communis are often seen as variations of the extensor indicis due to the shared characteristics and embryonic origin.

== Function ==
The extensor indicis extends the index finger, and by its continued action assists in extending (dorsiflexion) the wrist and the midcarpal joints.

Because the index finger and little finger have separate extensors, these fingers can be moved more independently than the other fingers.

== Additional images ==
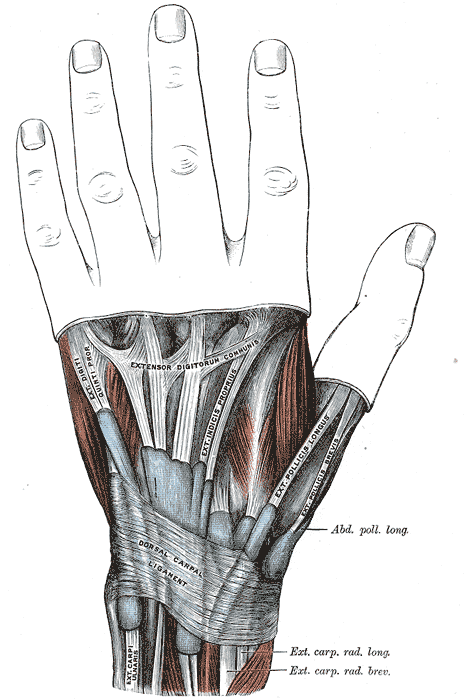
The mucous sheaths of the tendons on the back of the wrist. (Extensor indicis proprius visible going into second digit.)

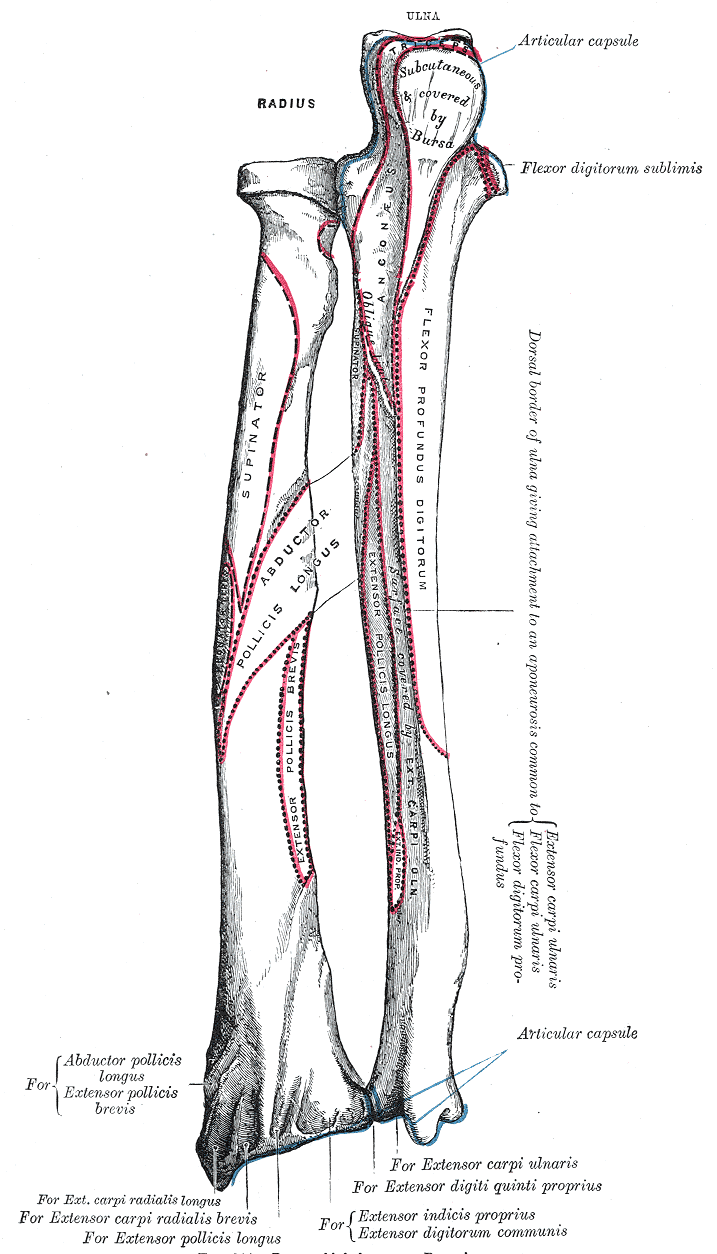
Bones of left forearm. Posterior aspect.

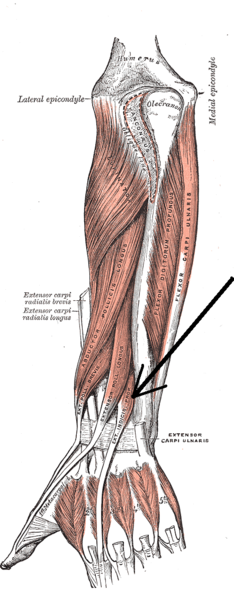
Posterior surface of the forearm. Deep muscles.

Transverse section across the wrist and digits.

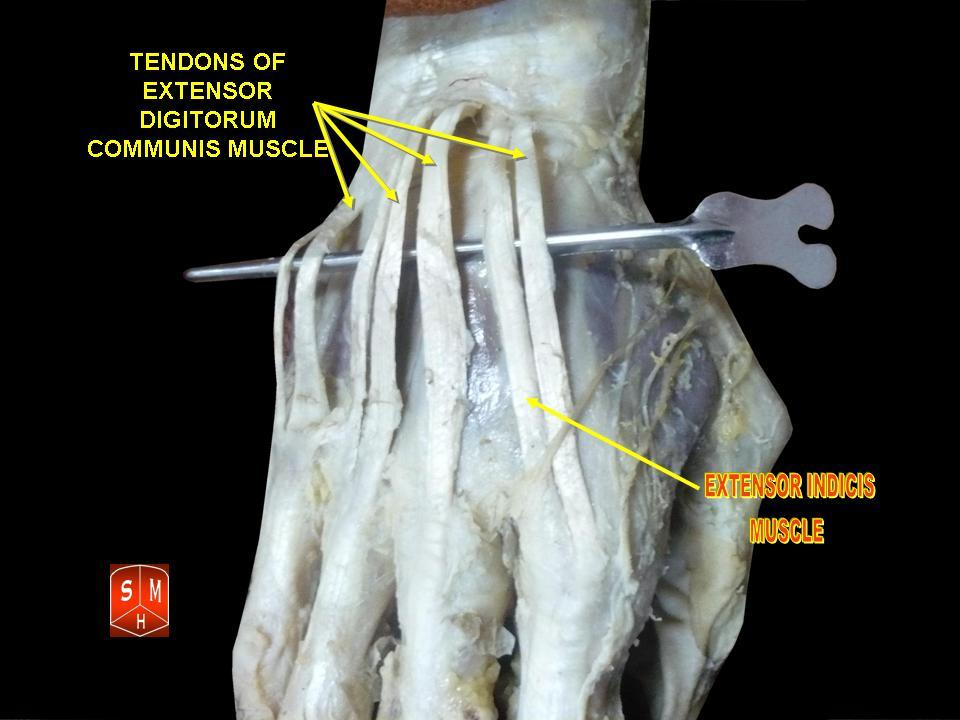
Extensor indicis muscle

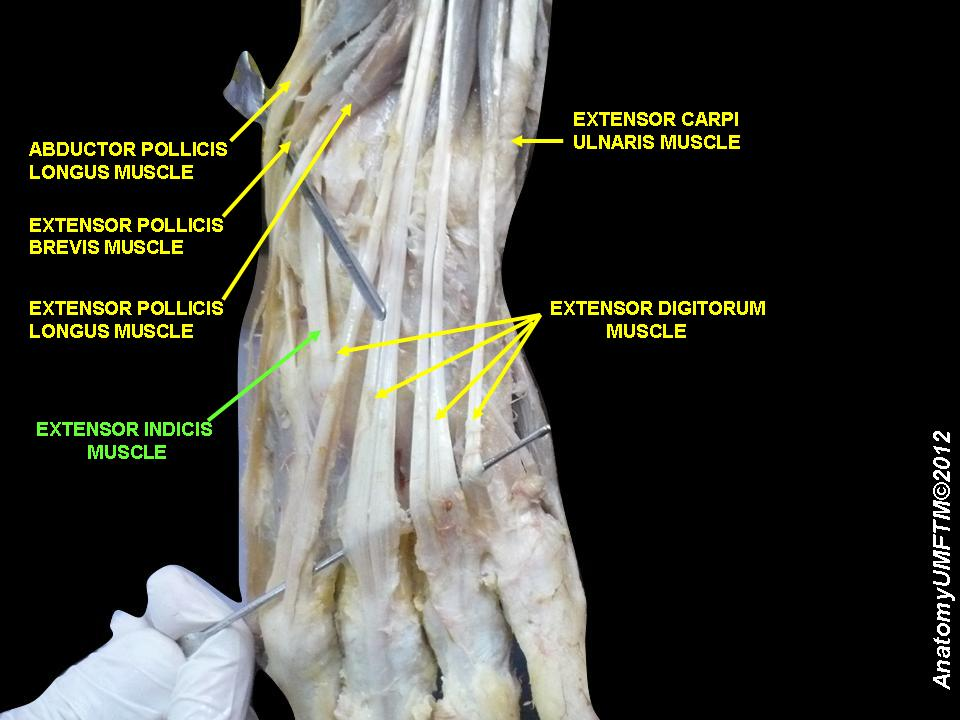
Extensor indicis muscle

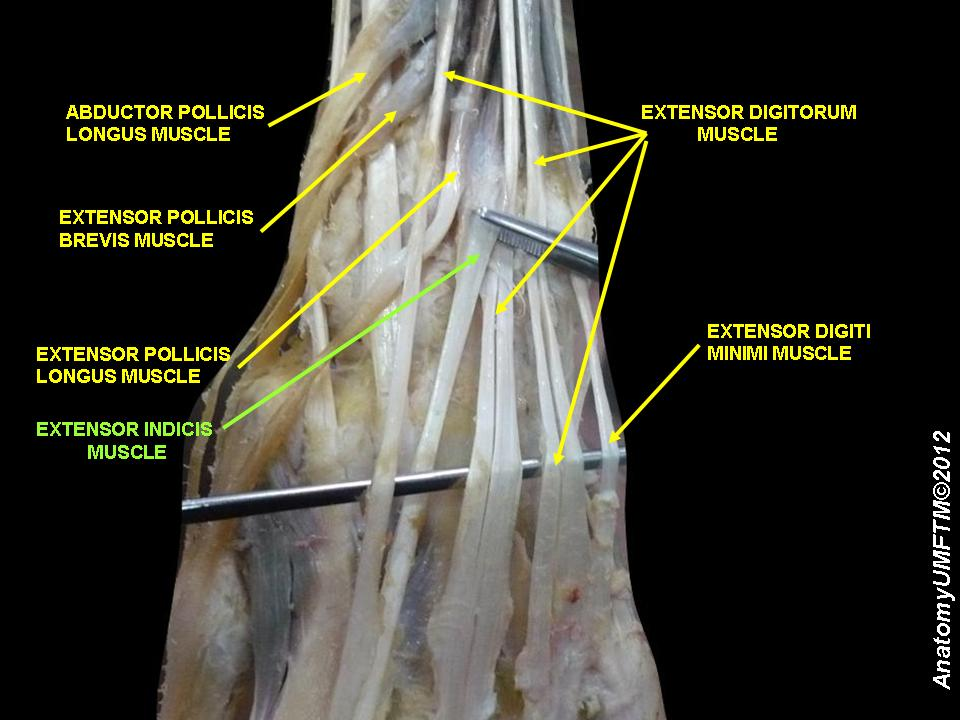
Extensor indicis muscle

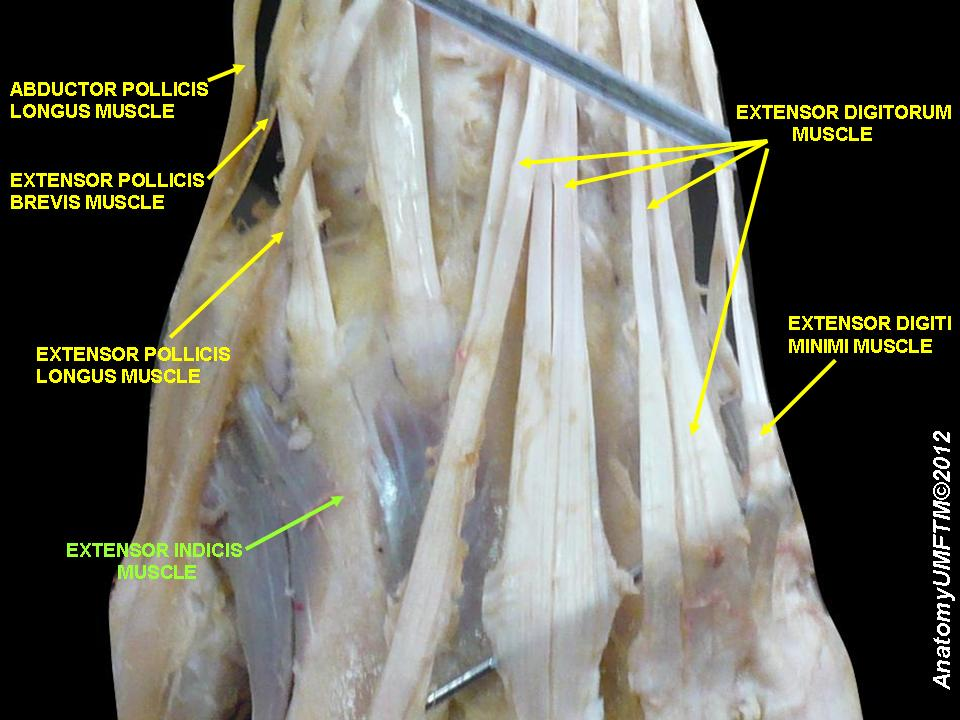
Extensor indicis muscle

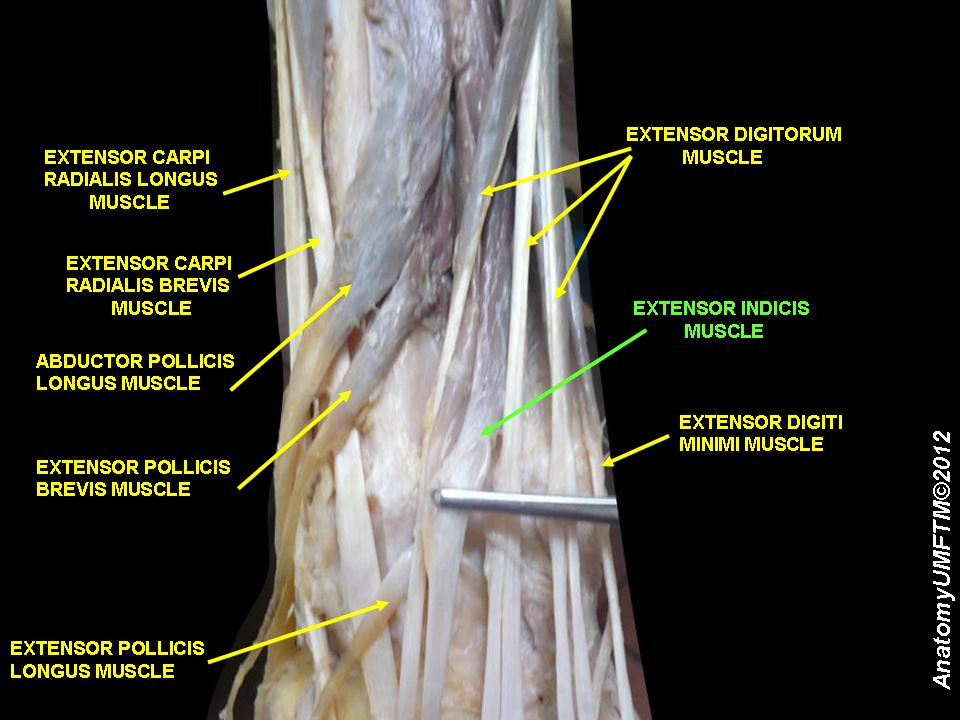
Extensor indicis muscle

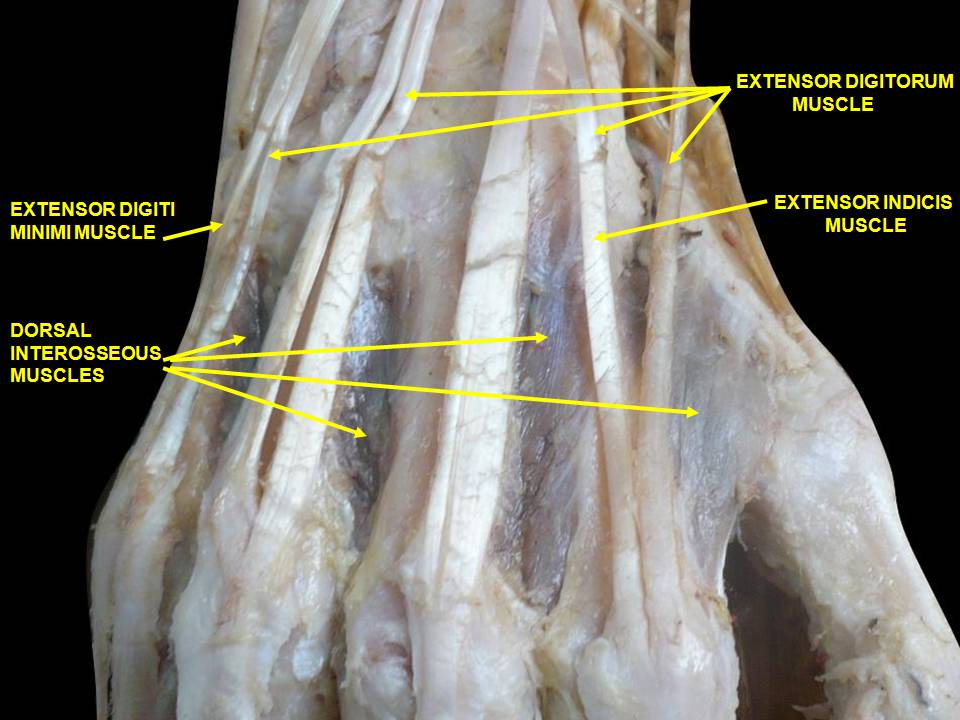
Muscles of hand. Posterior view.

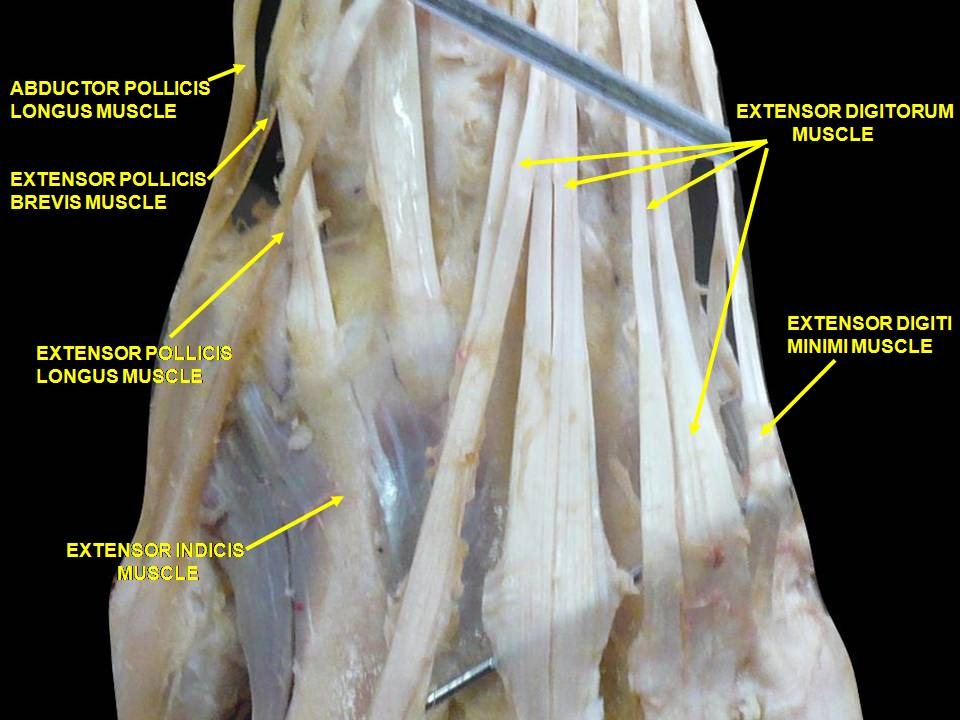
Muscles of hand. Posterior view.

== See also ==
- Extensor digitorum
- Extensor medii proprius
- Extensor indicis et medii communis
