= Extensor digitorum muscle =

Forearm muscle which extends the four fingers

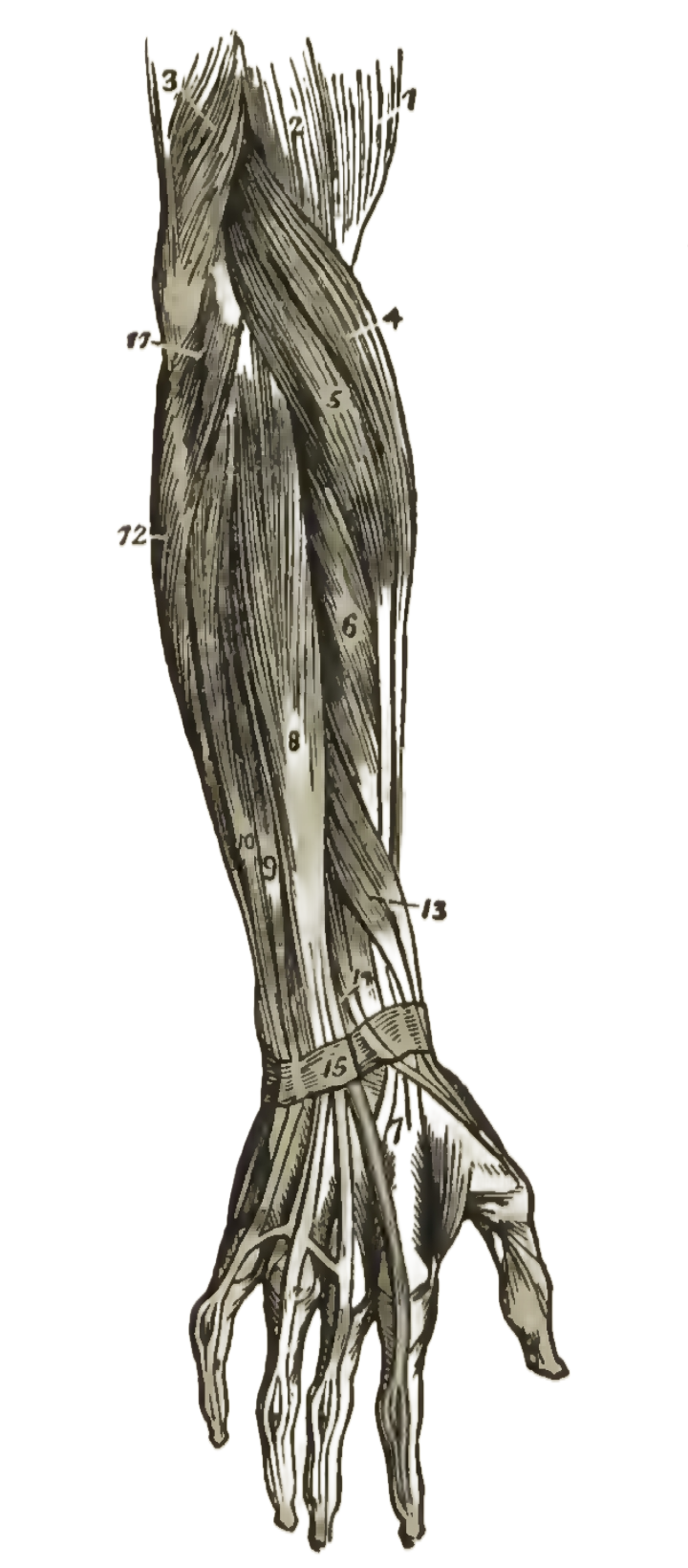
- Posterior surface of the right forearm. Superficial muscles. Extensor digitorum muscle is labeled 8. (From Quain's Anatomy.)

- Transverse section across the right-sided wrist and digits. (Ext. dig. communis labeled at bottom center.)

Details
- Origin: Lateral epicondyle (common extensor tendon)
- Insertion: Extensor expansion of middle and distal phalanges of the 2nd, 3rd, 4th, and 5th fingers
- Artery: Posterior interosseous artery
- Nerve: Posterior interosseous nerve
- Actions: Extension of hand, wrist and fingers
- Antagonist: Flexor digitorum superficialis muscle, flexor digitorum profundus muscle

Identifiers
- Latin: musculus extensor digitorum
- TA98: A04.6.02.042
- TA2: 2500
- FMA: 38500

The extensor digitorum muscle (also known as extensor digitorum communis) is a muscle of the posterior forearm present in humans and other animals. It extends the medial four digits of the hand. Extensor digitorum is innervated by the posterior interosseous nerve, which is a branch of the radial nerve.

== Structure ==
The extensor digitorum muscle arises from the lateral epicondyle of the humerus, by the common extensor tendon; from the intermuscular septa between it and the adjacent muscles, and from the antebrachial fascia. It divides below into four tendons, which pass, together with that of the extensor indicis proprius, through a separate compartment of the extensor retinaculum, within a mucous sheath. The tendons then diverge on the back of the hand, and are inserted into the middle and distal phalanges of the fingers in the following manner.

Opposite the metacarpophalangeal articulation each tendon is bound by fasciculi to the collateral ligaments and serves as the dorsal ligament of this joint; after having crossed the joint, it spreads out into a broad aponeurosis, which covers the dorsal surface of the first phalanx and is reinforced, in this situation, by the tendons of the interossei and lumbricalis.

Opposite the first interphalangeal joint this aponeurosis divides into three slips; an intermediate and two collateral: the former is inserted into the base of the second phalanx; and the two collateral, which are continued onward along the sides of the second phalanx, unite by their contiguous margins, and are inserted into the dorsal surface of the last phalanx. As the tendons cross the interphalangeal joints, they furnish them with dorsal ligaments. The tendon to the index finger is accompanied by the tendon of extensor indicis, which lies on its ulnar side. On the back of the hand, the tendons to the middle, ring, and little fingers are connected by two obliquely placed bands, one from the third tendon passing inferior and laterally to the second tendon, and the other passing from the same tendon inferior and medially to the fourth.

The extensor tendons are connected to the second by a thin transverse band, known as the juncturae tendinum; they serve to maintain the central alignment of the extensor tendons over the metacarpal head, thus increasing the available leverage. Injuries (such as by an external flexion force during active extension) may allow the tendon to dislocate into the intermetacarpal space; the extensor tendon then acts as a flexor and the finger may no longer be actively extended. This may be corrected surgically by using a slip of the extensor tendon to replace the damaged ligamentous band.

== Function ==
The extensor digitorum muscle extends the phalanges, then the wrist, and finally the elbow. It tends to separate the fingers as it extends them.

In the fingers, the extensor digitorum acts principally on the proximal phalanges, acting to extend the metacarpophalangeal joint. Extension of the proximal and distal interphalangeal joints, however, is mediated predominantly by the dorsal and palmar interossei and lumbricals of the hand.

== Additional images ==
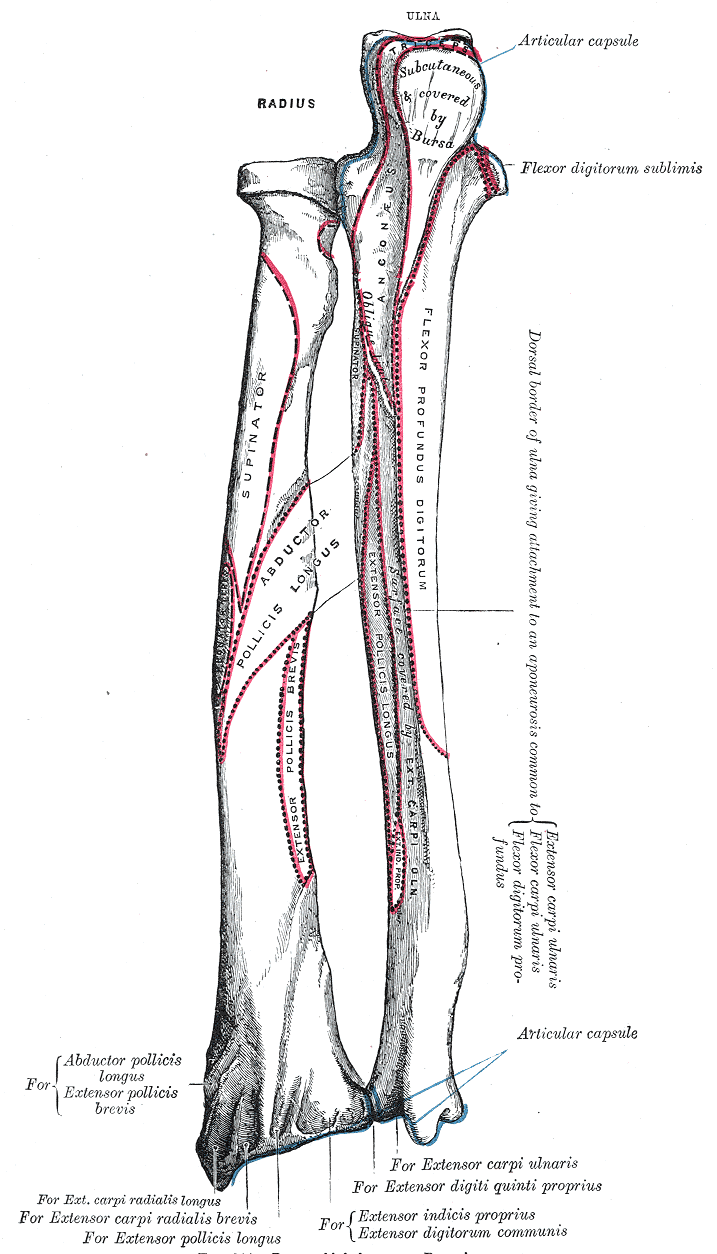
Bones of left forearm. Posterior aspect.

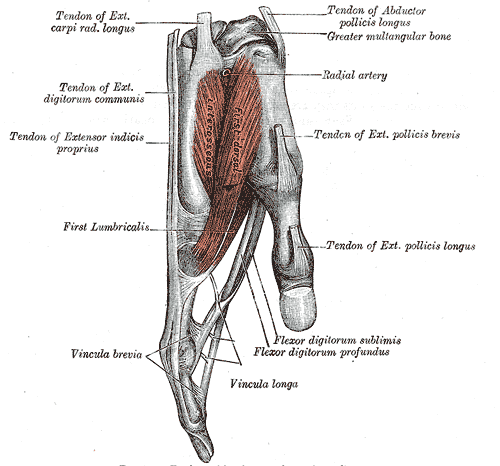
Tendons of forefinger and vincula tendina.

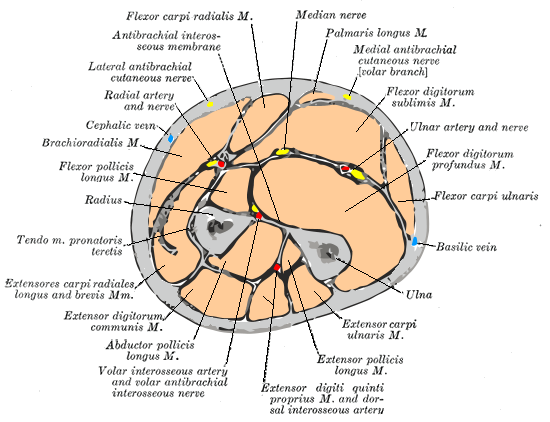
Cross-section through the middle of the forearm.

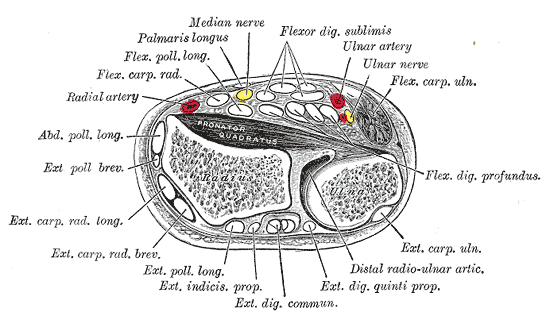
Transverse section across distal ends of radius and ulna.

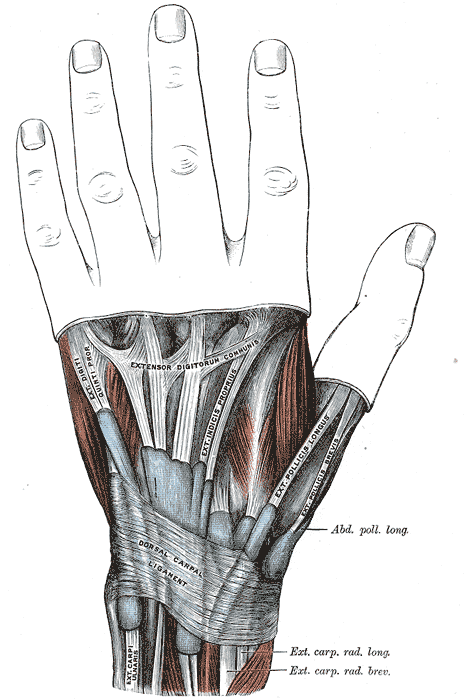
The mucous sheaths of the tendons on the back of the wrist.

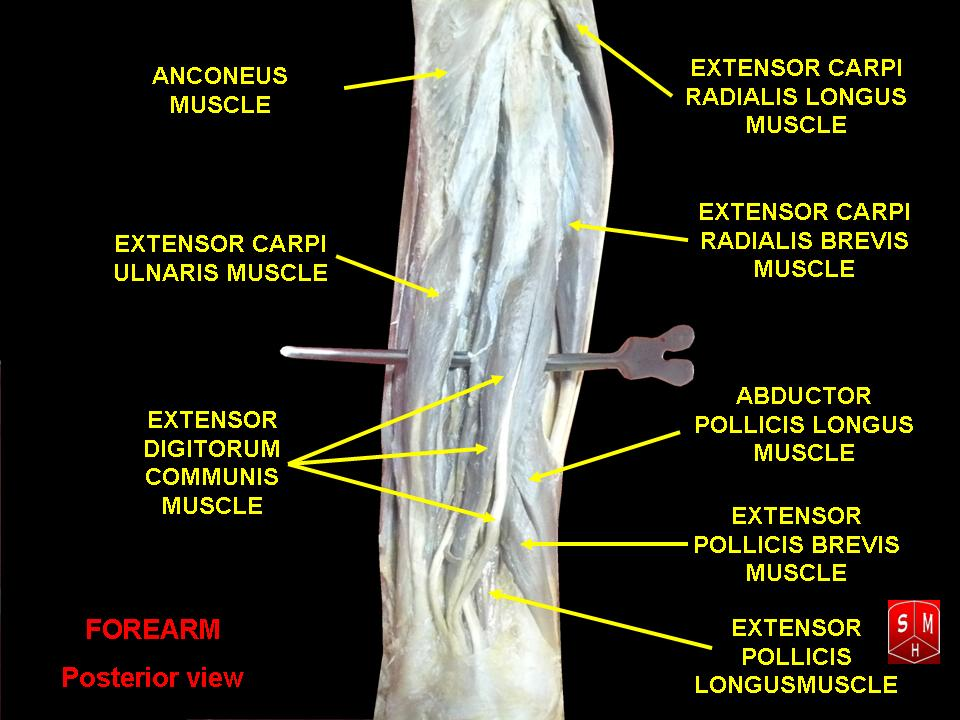
Extensor digitorum communis muscle

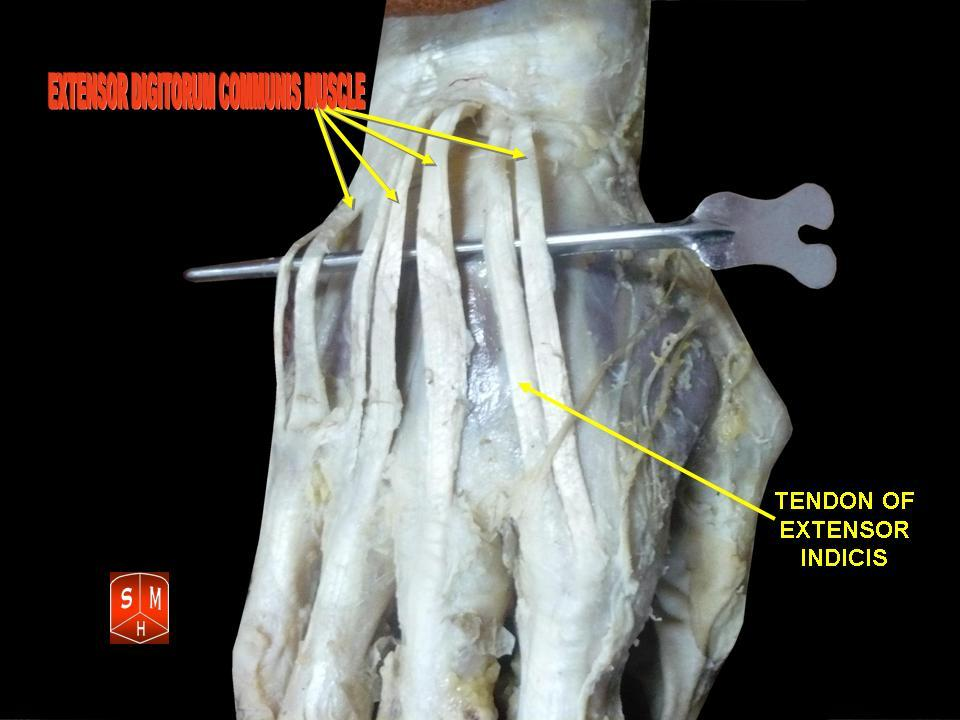
Extensor digitorum muscles

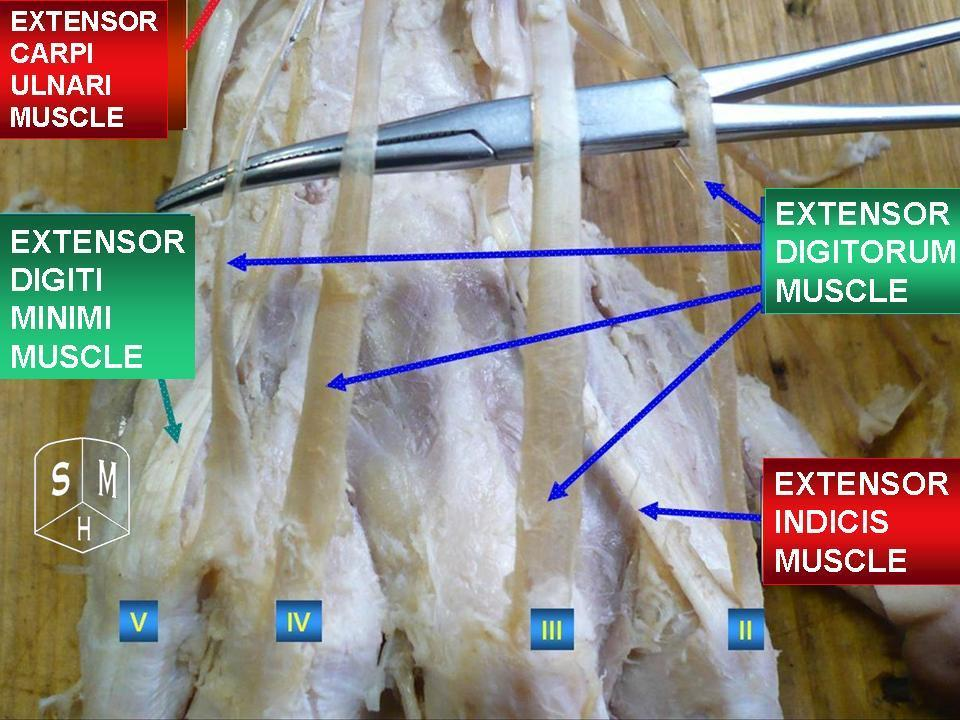
Extensor digitorum muscle

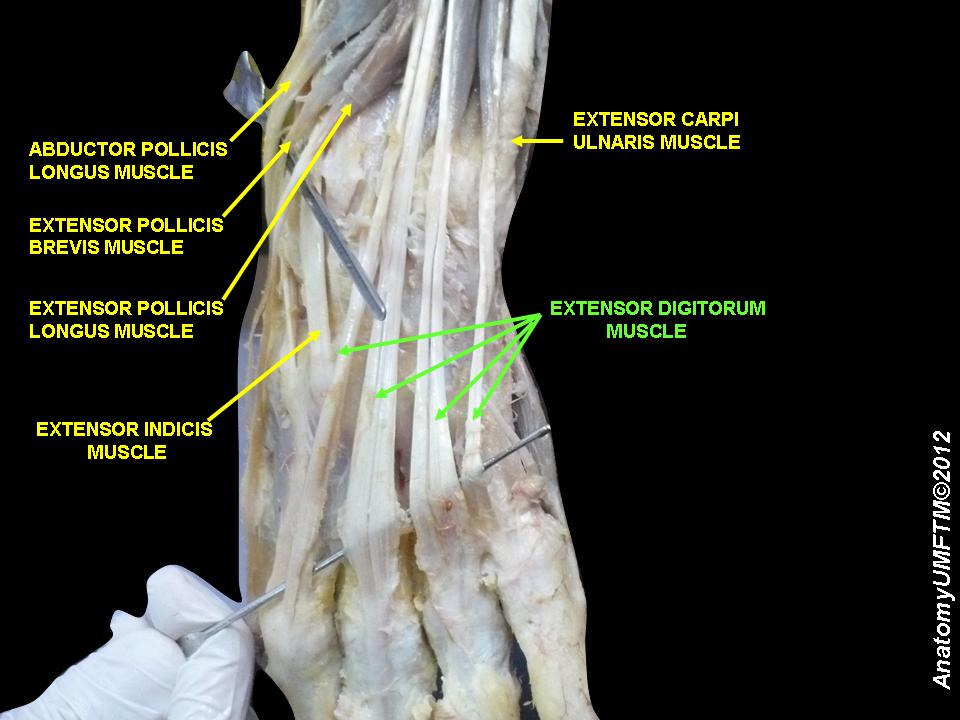
Extensor digitorum muscle

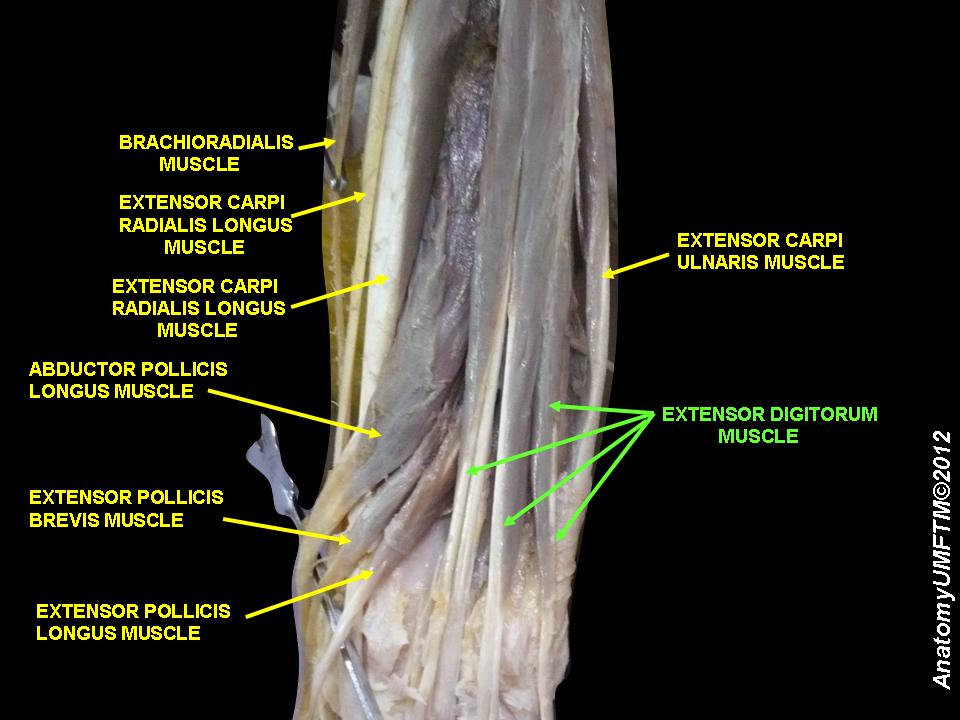
Extensor digitorum muscle

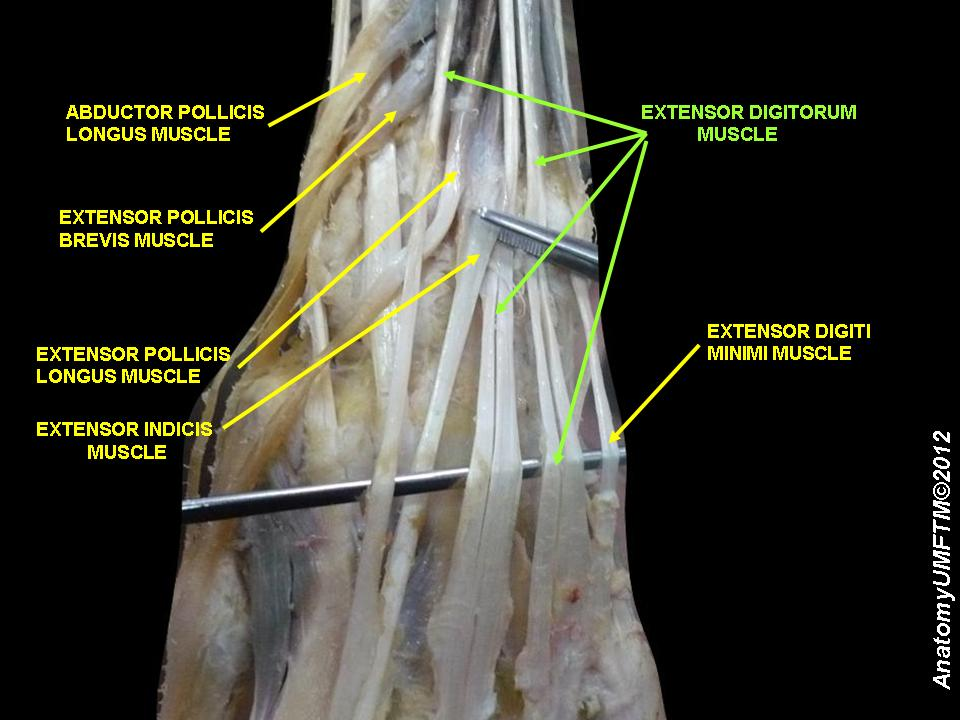
Extensor digitorum muscle

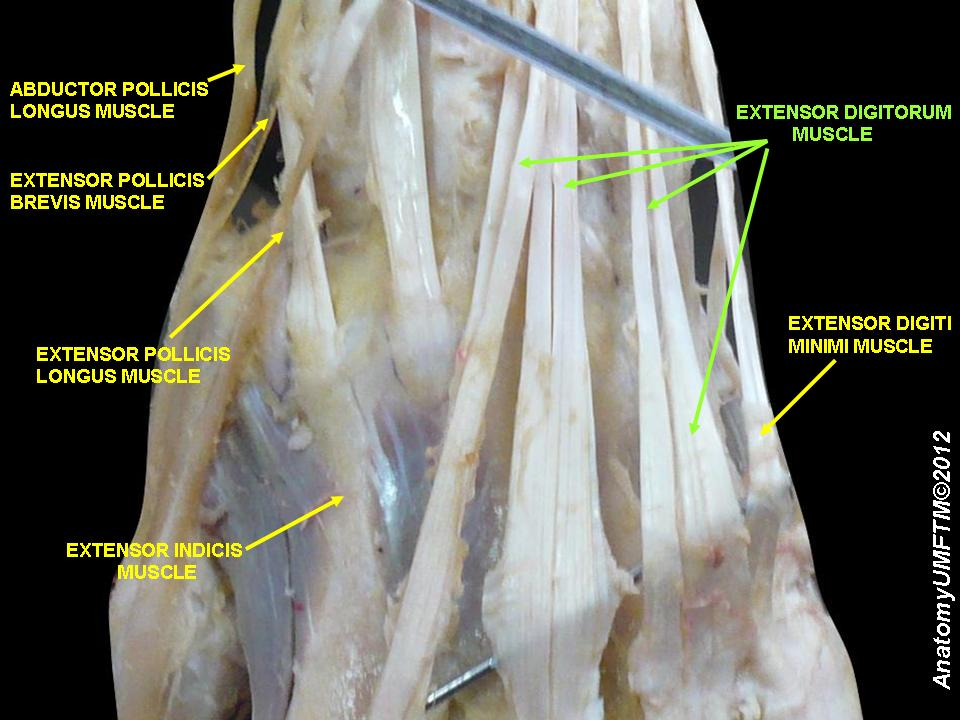
Extensor digitorum muscle

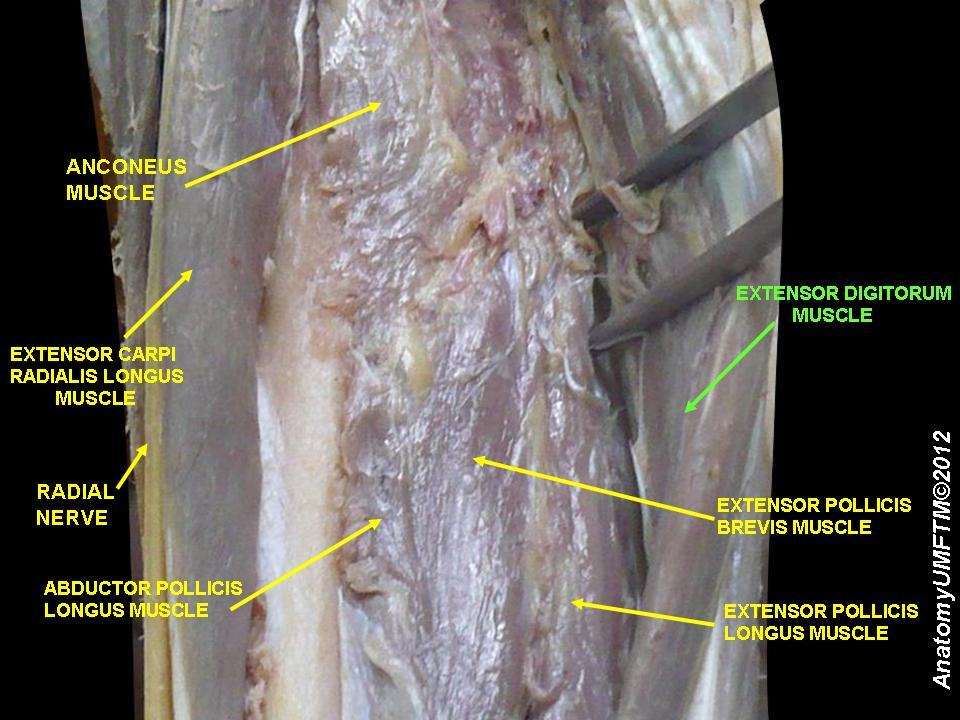
Extensor digitorum muscle

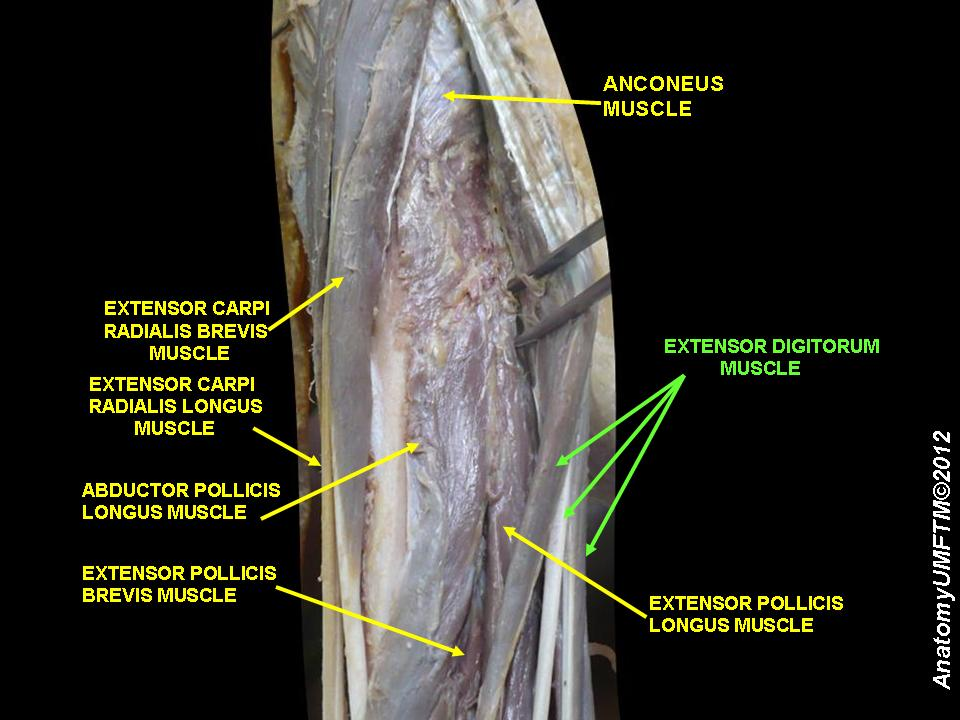
Extensor digitorum muscle

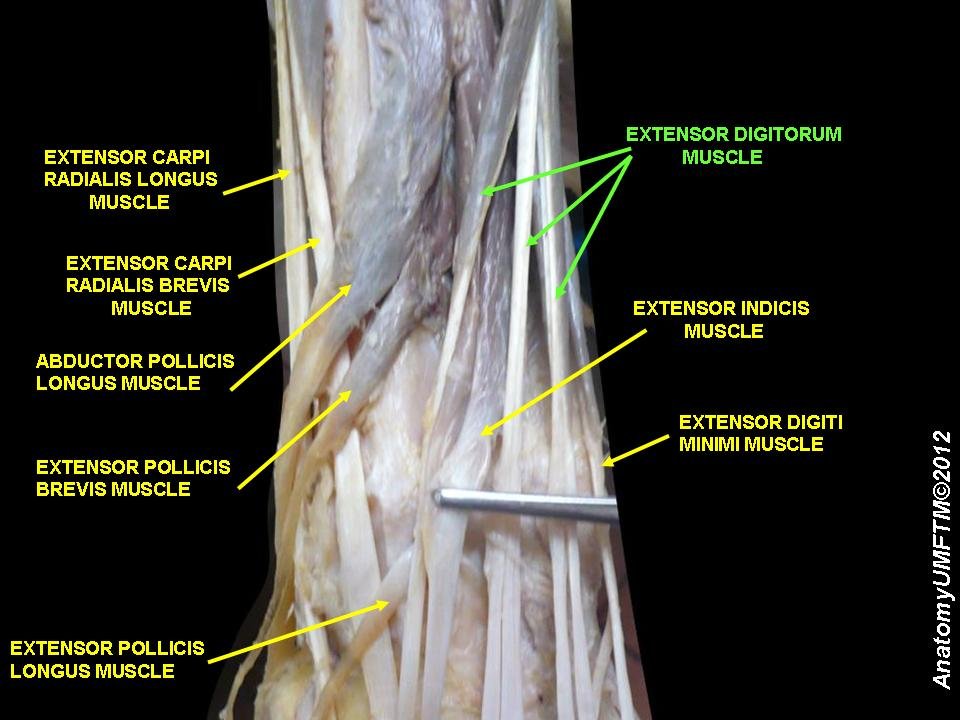
Extensor digitorum muscle

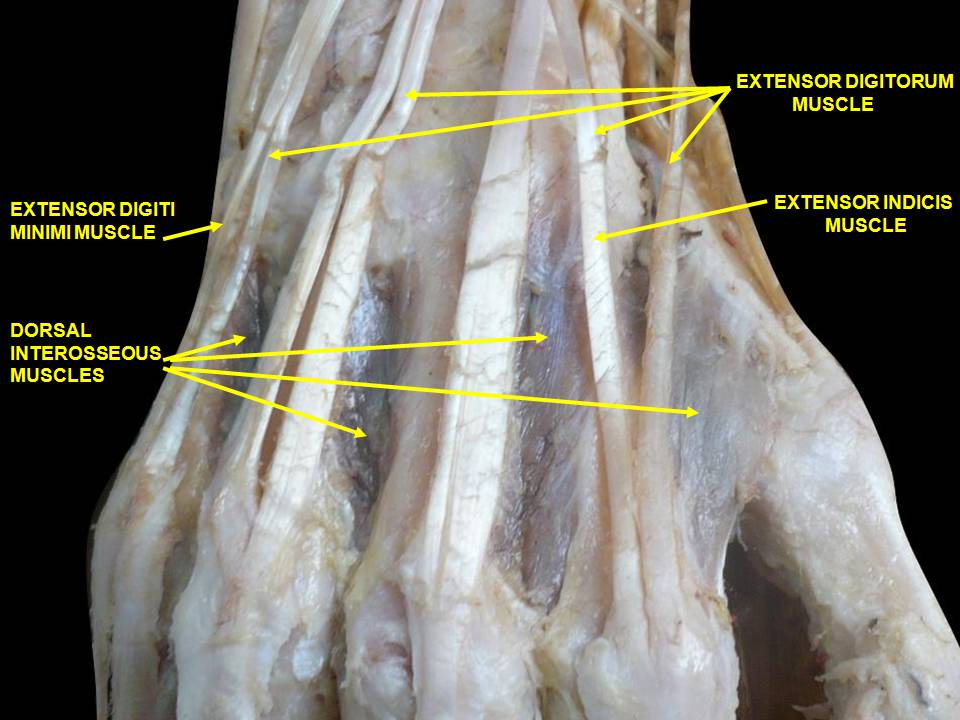
Muscles of hand. Posterior view.

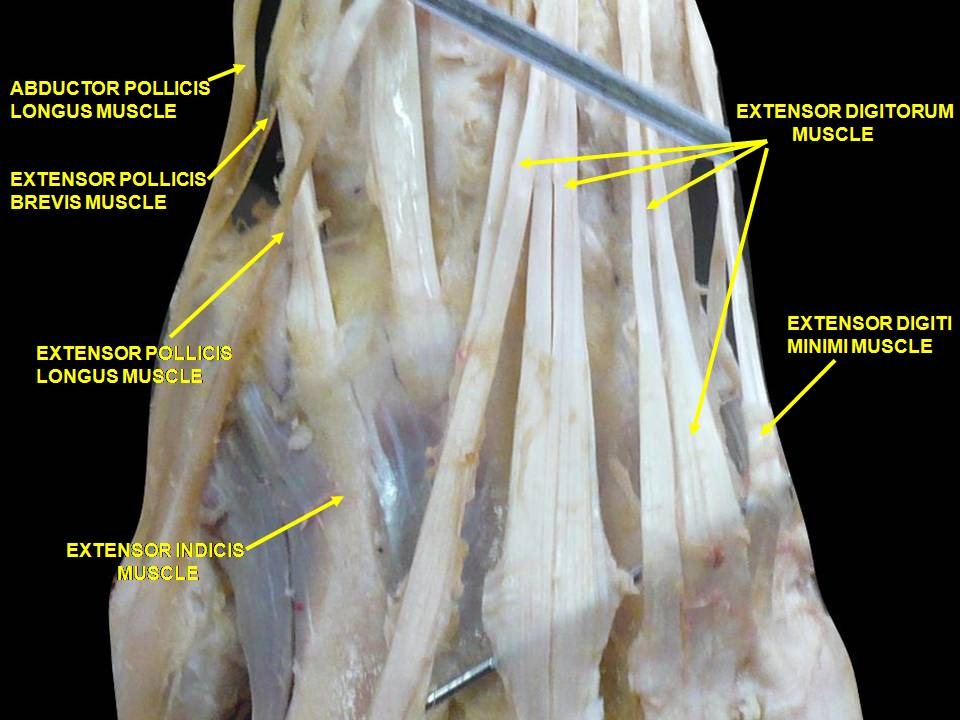
Muscles of hand. Posterior view.

== See also ==
- Extensor digitorum brevis muscle (leg)
- Extensor digitorum longus muscle (leg)
- Flexor digitorum profundus muscle (hand)
- Flexor digitorum superficialis muscle (hand)
- Extensor digitorum reflex (Braunecker-Effenberg reflex)
