= Extensor expansion =

Special connective attachments by which the extensor tendons insert into the phalanges

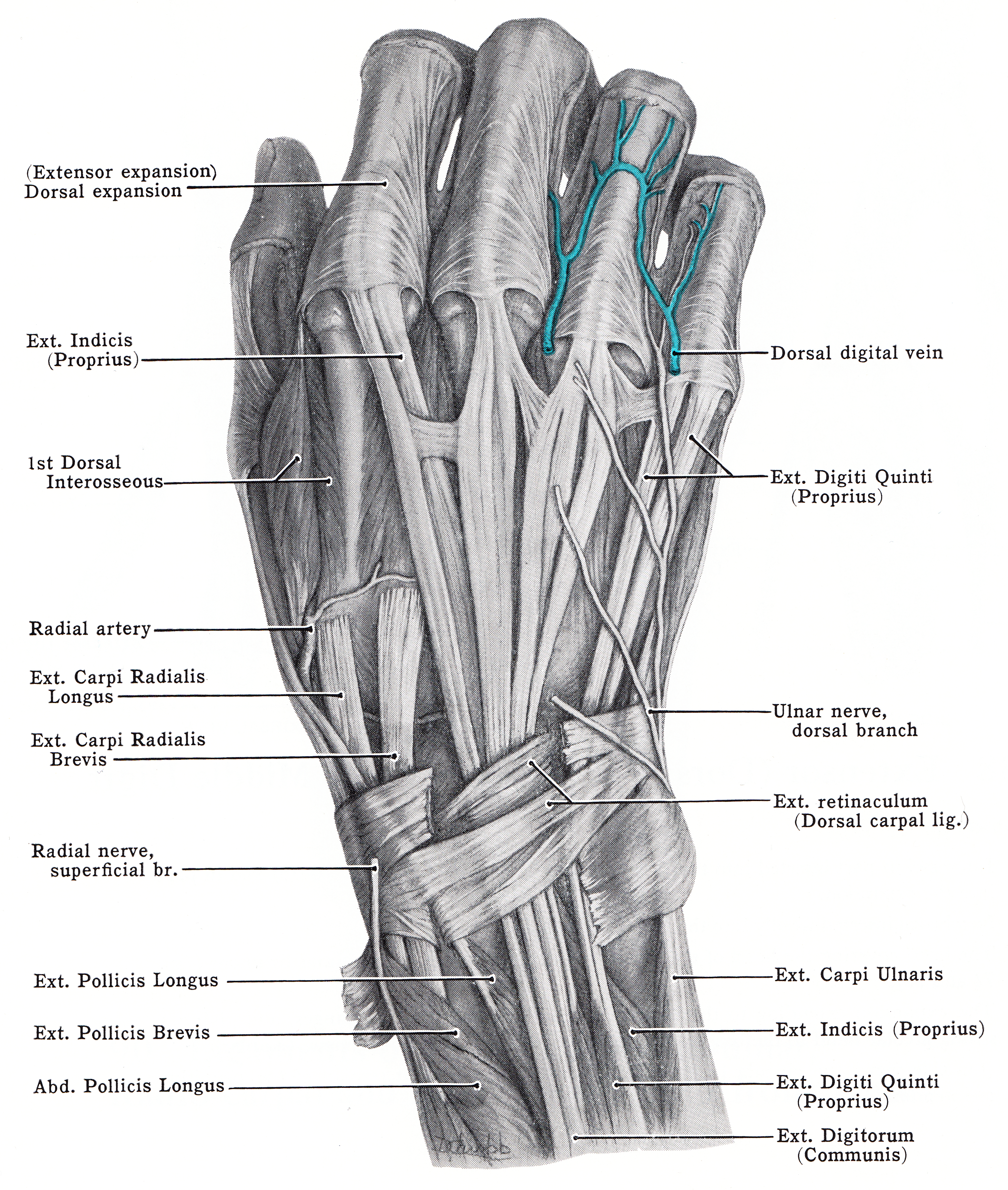
- Extensor expansion covers the tendon of extensor digitorum tendons over the proximal phalanges
- TA2: 2502

An extensor expansion (extensor hood, dorsal expansion, dorsal hood, dorsal aponeurosis) is the special connective attachments by which the extensor tendons insert into the phalanges.

These flattened tendons (aponeurosis) of extensor muscles span the proximal and middle phalanges.

At the distal end of the metacarpal, the extensor tendon will expand to form a hood, which covers the back and sides of the head of the metacarpal and the proximal phalanx.

== Bands ==
The expansion soon divides into three bands:

- lateral bands pass on either side of the proximal phalanx and stretch all the way to the distal phalanx. The lumbricals of the hand, extensor indicis muscle, dorsal interossei of the hand, and palmar interossei insert on these bands.
- A single median band passes down the middle of the finger along the back of the proximal phalanx, inserting into the base of the middle phalanx.
- A band known as the retinacular ligament runs obliquely along the middle phalanx, and connects the fibrous digital sheath on the anterior side of the phalanges to the extensor expansion.

== Function ==
The extensor expansion allows for contractile forces from the extensor compartment muscles to be transferred to the phalanges. It also balances the forces across the phalanges.
