= Interosseous membrane =

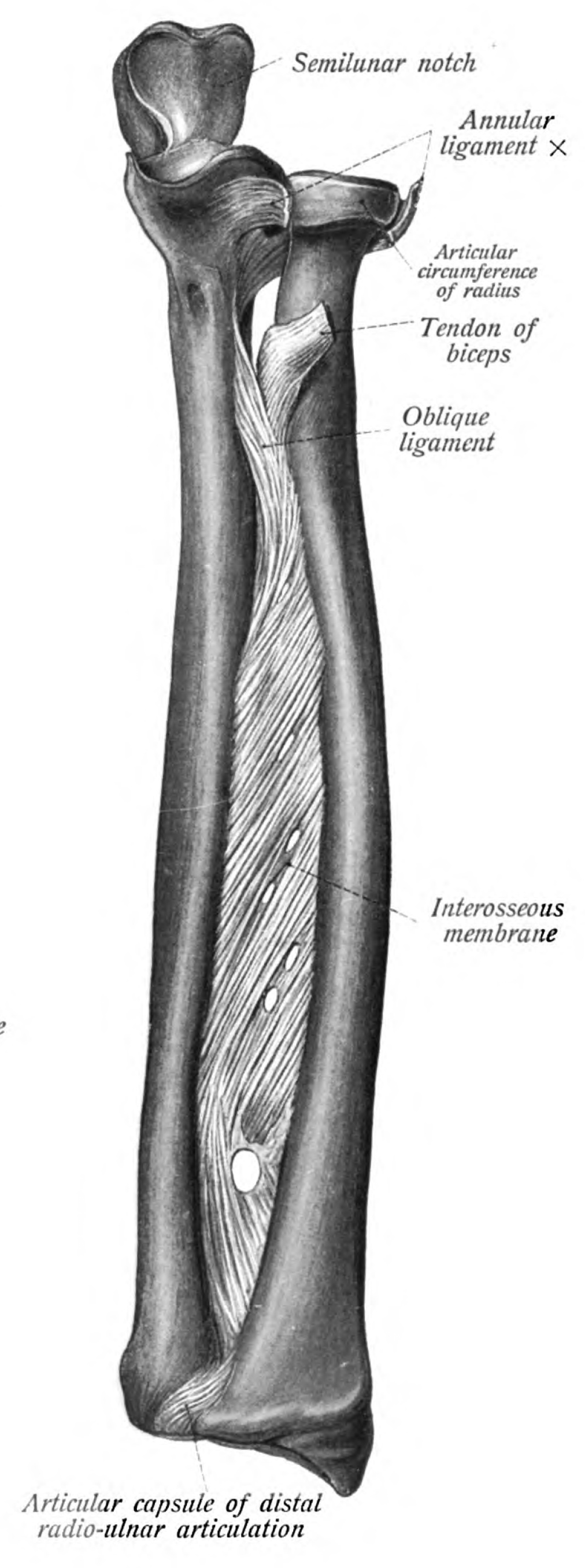
- Interosseous membrane. Ulna and radius, left arm.

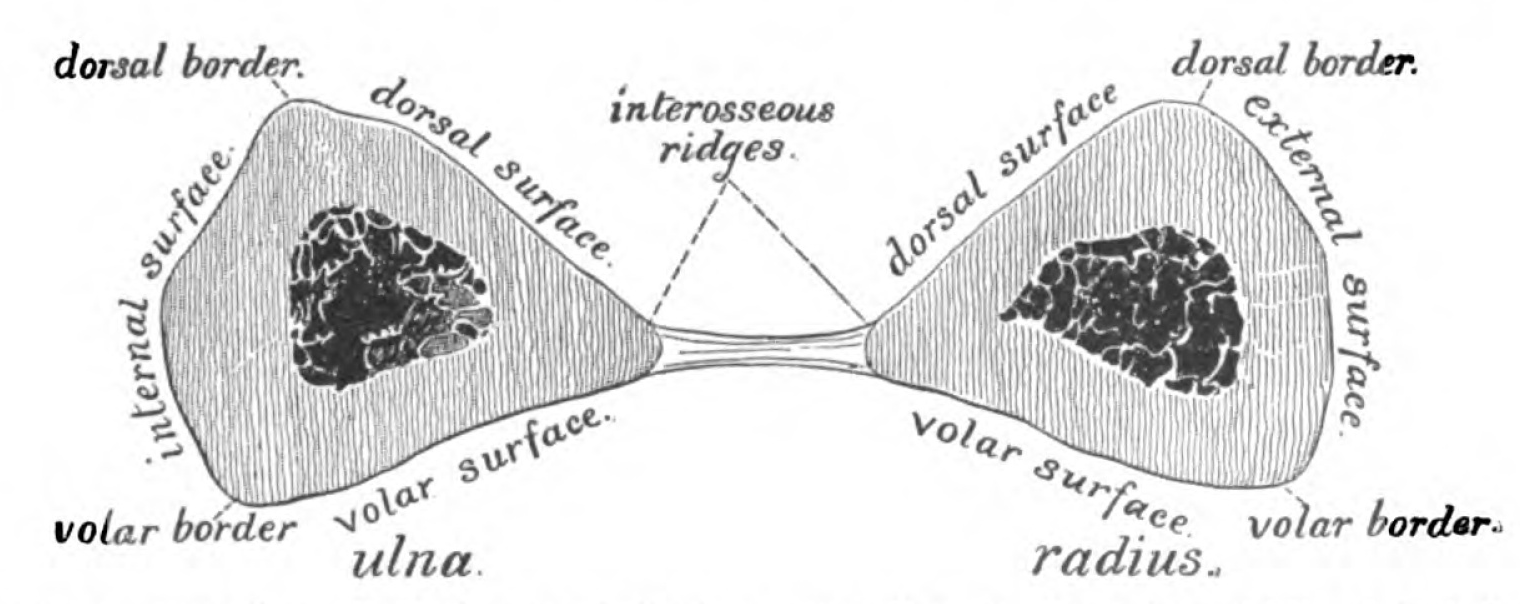
- Interosseous membrane.

Details

Identifiers
- Latin: membrana interossea
- MeSH: D000080944
- TA98: A03.0.00.007
- TA2: 1520
- FMA: 54839

An interosseous membrane is a thick dense fibrous sheet of connective tissue that spans the space between two bones, forming a type of syndesmosis joint.

Interosseous membranes in the human body:

- Interosseous membrane of forearm
- Interosseous membrane of leg

== Gallery ==
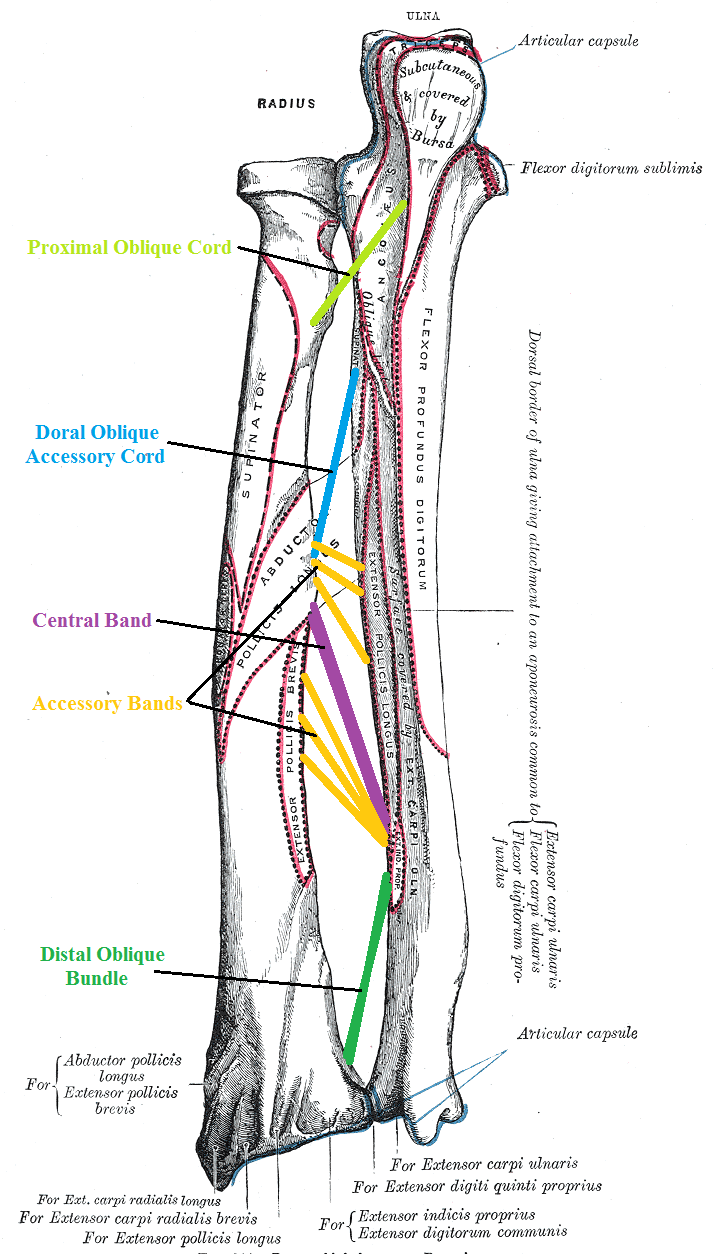
Five ligaments of interosseous membrane of forearm:
* Central band (key portion to be reconstructed in case of injury)
* Accessory band
* Distal oblique bundle
* Proximal oblique cord
* Dorsal oblique accessory cord
