= Interosseous membrane of forearm =

Fibrous sheet between radius and ulna

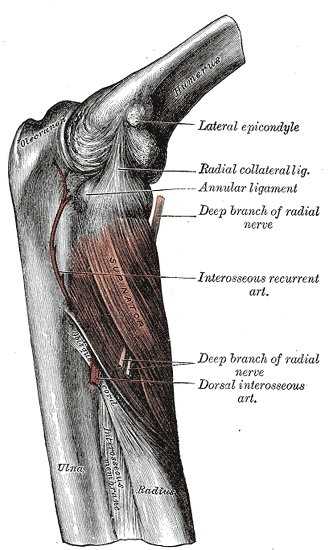
- Image of human elbow and forearm. Interosseous membrane labeled at bottom center.

Details

Identifiers
- Latin: membrana interossea antebrachii
- TA98: A03.5.06.002
- TA2: 1761
- FMA: 23706

The interosseous membrane of the forearm (rarely middle or intermediate radioulnar joint) is a fibrous sheet that connects the interosseous margins of the radius and the ulna. It is the main part of the radio-ulnar syndesmosis, a fibrous joint between the two bones.

== Function ==
The interosseous membrane divides the forearm into anterior and posterior compartments, serves as a site of attachment for muscles of the forearm, and transfers loads placed on the forearm.

The interosseous membrane is designed to shift compressive loads (as in doing a hand-stand) from the distal radius to the proximal ulna. The fibers within the interosseous membrane are oriented obliquely so that when force is applied the fibers are drawn taut, shifting more of the load to the ulna. This reduces the wear and tear of placing the whole load on a single joint. The role of the membrane in load shifting is illustrated when the interosseous membrane is cut; the forces on each bone equalize from their natural proportions.

Additionally, as the forearm moves from pronation to supination, the interosseous membrane fibers change from a relaxed state, to a tense state in the neutral position. They once again become relaxed as the forearm enters pronation.

The interosseous membrane is composed of five ligaments:

1. Central band (key portion to be reconstructed in case of injury)
2. Accessory band
3. Distal oblique bundle
4. Proximal oblique cord
5. Dorsal oblique accessory cord

== Injury ==
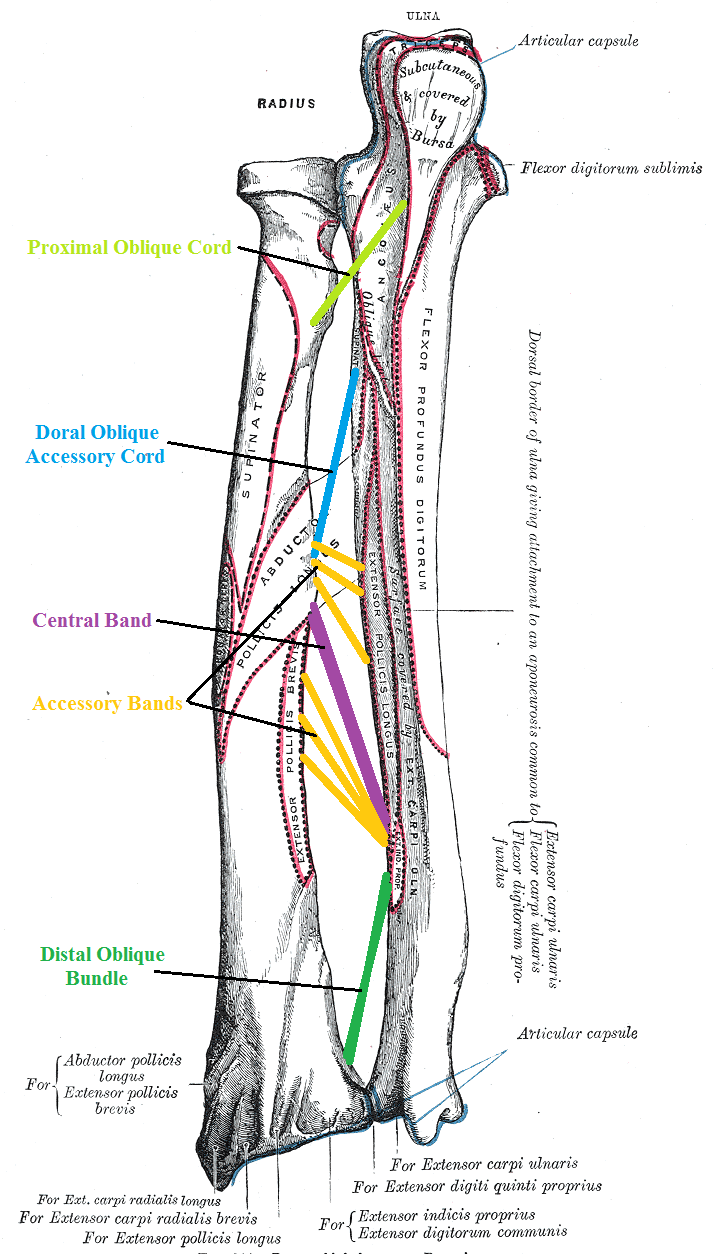
The interosseous membrane is composed of 5 ligaments:- Central band (key portion to be reconstructed in case of injury)- Accessory band- Distal oblique bundle- Proximal oblique cord- Dorsal oblique accessory cord

Severe forearm injuries involving separation of the radius and ulna may be due to rupture of the interosseous membrane. Rupture can lead to proximal migration of the radius and an apparent lengthening of the ulna at the wrist. Often interosseous membrane tears are associated with adverse impacts on forearm rotation. MRI-assisted diagnosis has been used for mid-substance tears of the interosseous membrane but is expensive and not widely available. On the contrary, ultrasound has proven useful in diagnosing tears of the tibiofibular interosseous membrane of the leg, and this technique may also be applied to acute cases of membrane tears in the forearm due to its low cost and portability.

== See also ==
- Anterior interosseous nerve
- Anterior interosseous artery
- Posterior interosseous nerve
- Posterior interosseous artery
- Common interosseous artery
- Recurrent interosseous artery
