= Radial nerve dysfunction =

- Other names: Radial neuropathy, radial mononeuropathy
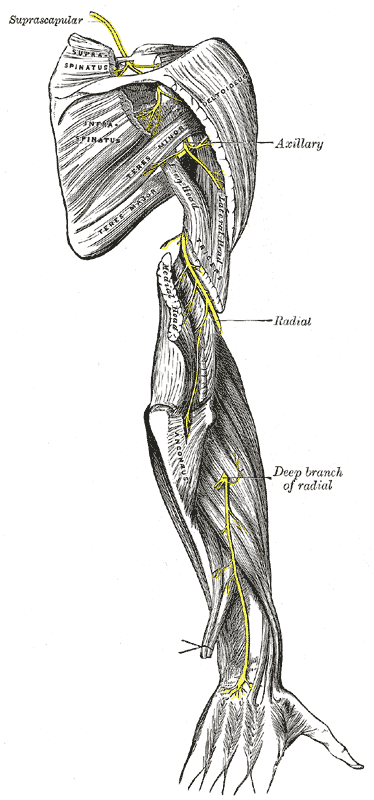
- The suprascapular, axillary, and radial nerves.
- Specialty: Neurology

Radial nerve dysfunction is a problem associated with the radial nerve resulting from injury consisting of acute trauma to the radial nerve. The damage has sensory consequences, as it interferes with the radial nerve's innervation of the skin of the posterior forearm, lateral three digits, and the dorsal surface of the lateral side of the palm. The damage also has motor consequences, as it interferes with the radial nerve's innervation of the muscles associated with the extension at the elbow, wrist, and fingers, as well the supination of the forearm. This type of injury can be difficult to localize, but relatively common, as many ordinary occurrences can lead to the injury and resulting mononeuropathy. One out of every ten patients with radial nerve dysfunction do so because of a fractured humerus.

== Signs and symptoms ==
People experiencing radial nerve dysfunction may also experience any of the following symptoms:

- Lost ability or discomfort in extending the elbow
- Lost ability or discomfort bending hand back at the wrist
- Numbness
- Abnormal sensations near the thumb, index and middle fingers
- Sharp or burning pain
- Weakness in grip
- Drooping of the hand, also called wrist drop

== Cause ==
There are many ways to acquire radial nerve palsy.

The term Saturday Night Palsy refers to an injury to the radial nerve in the spiral groove of the humerus caused while sleeping in a position that would under normal circumstances cause discomfort. It can occur when a person falls asleep while heavily medicated and/or under the influence of alcohol with the underside of the arm compressed by a bar edge, bench, chair back, or like object. Sleeping with the head resting on the arm can also cause radial nerve palsy.

Breaking the humerus and deep puncture wounds can also cause the condition.

Posterior interosseus palsy is distinguished from radial nerve palsy by the preservation of elbow extension. Symptoms vary depending on the severity and location of the trauma; however, common symptoms include wrist drop (the inability to extend the wrist upward when the hand is palm down); numbness of the back of the hand and wrist, specifically over the first web space which is innervated by the radial nerve; and inability to voluntarily straighten the fingers or extend the thumb, which is performed by muscles of the extensor group, all of which are primarily innervated by the radial nerve. Loss of wrist extension is due to paralysis of the posterior compartment of forearm muscles; although the elbow extensors are also innervated by the radial nerve, their innervation is usually spared because the compression occurs below, distal, to the level of the axillary nerve, which innervates the long head of the triceps, and the upper branches of the radial nerve that innervate the remainder of the Triceps.

Saturnine neuropathy can also be a cause of radial neuropathy (radial palsy).

== Mechanism ==
The radial nerve, like any other in the nervous system, is vulnerable to damage. This damage can originate when the nerve fibers experience pressure, stretching, or cutting. All of the tissues can prevent action potentials from continuing up or down axons within the nerve, which would interrupt signal transduction to and from the brain. As a result of the interrupted signal, the patient may experience loss of feeling and/or motor control.

== Diagnosis ==
In order to diagnose radial nerve dysfunction, a doctor will conduct a physical examination. During the exam of the arm, wrist, and hand, the doctor will look for: difficulty straightening the arm at the elbow; trouble turning the arm outward; difficulty lifting the wrist; muscle loss or atrophy in the forearm; weakness of the wrist and/or fingers. In addition, tests may need to be conducted to confirm the doctors findings. These tests include: blood tests; MRI of the neck and shoulders to screen for other problems; nerve biopsy; nerve conduction tests; ultrasound of the elbow.

== Prognosis ==
Radial neuropathy is not necessarily permanent. The majority of radial neuropathies due to an acute compressive event (Saturday night palsy) do recover without intervention. If the injury is demyelinating (meaning only the myelin sheath surrounding the nerve is damaged), then full recovery typically occurs within 2–4 weeks. If the injury is axonal (meaning the underlying nerve fiber itself is damaged) then full recovery may take months or years, or may never occur. EMG and nerve conduction studies are typically performed to diagnose the extent and distribution of the damage, and to help with prognosis for recovery.

== Society and culture ==
There are a number of colloquial terms used to describe radial nerve injuries, which are usually dependent on the causation factor:

- Saturday night palsy from falling asleep with one's arm hanging over the arm rest of a chair, compressing the radial nerve at the spiral groove.
- Honeymoon palsy from another individual sleeping on and compressing one's arm overnight. This can also refer to anterior interosseous nerve palsy from compression on the forearm resulting in an inability to flex the index and thumb tips. In this interpretation, it is a branch of the median nerve and not the radial nerve which is affected.
- Handcuff neuropathy from tight-fitting handcuffs compressing the superficial branch of the distal radial nerve; this is also referred to as cheiralgia paresthetica.
- Crutch palsy from poorly fitted axillary crutches.
