= Extensor pollicis muscle =

Extensor pollicis muscle may refer to:

- Extensor pollicis longus muscle, a skeletal muscle on the dorsal side of the forearm
- Extensor pollicis brevis muscle, a skeletal muscle on the dorsal side of the forearm
