= Wrist drop =

- Other names: Radial nerve palsy, musculospiral nerve palsy, crutch paralysis, Saturday night palsy, honeymoon palsy
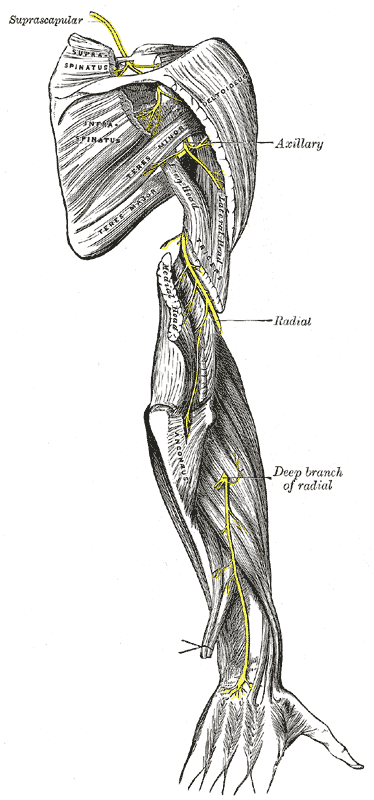
- The suprascapular, axillary, and radial nerves.
- Specialty: Neurology

Wrist drop is a medical condition in which the wrist and the fingers cannot extend at the metacarpophalangeal joints. The wrist remains partially flexed due to an opposing action of flexor muscles of the forearm. As a result, the extensor muscles in the posterior compartment remain paralyzed.

== Forearm anatomy ==
The forearm is the part of the body that extends from the elbow to the wrist and is not to be confused with the arm, which extends from the shoulder to the elbow.

The extensor muscles in the forearm are the extensor carpi ulnaris, extensor digiti minimi, extensor digitorum, extensor indicis, extensor carpi radialis brevis, and extensor carpi radialis longus. These extensor muscles are supplied by the posterior interosseous nerve, a branch of the radial nerve. Other muscles in the forearm that are innervated by this nerve are the supinator, extensor pollicis brevis, extensor pollicis longus and abductor pollicis longus. All of these muscles are situated in the posterior half of the forearm (posterior is when it is in its standard anatomical position). Also, the brachioradialis, anconeus, triceps brachii and extensor carpi radialis longus are all innervated by muscular branches of the radial nerve in the arm.

== Causes ==
Wrist extension is achieved by muscles in the forearm contracting, pulling on tendons that attach distal to (beyond) the wrist. If the tendons, muscles, or nerves supplying these muscles are damaged or otherwise not working as they should be, wrist drop may occur.

The following situations may result in wrist drop:

- Stab wounds to the chest at or below the clavicle–The radial nerve is the terminal branch of the posterior cord of the brachial plexus. A stab wound may damage the posterior cord and result in neurological deficits, including an inability to abduct the shoulder beyond the first 15 degrees, an inability to extend the forearm, reduced ability to supinate the hand, reduced ability to abduct the thumb and sensory loss to the posterior surface of the arm and hand.
- Broken humerus–The radial nerve can be damaged if the humerus (the bone of the arm) is broken because it runs through the radial groove on the lateral border of this bone along with the deep brachial artery.
- Lead poisoning–Wrist drop is associated with lead poisoning due to the effect of lead on the radial nerve.
- Persistent injury–Persistent injury to the nerve is a common cause through either repetitive motion or by applying pressure externally along the route of the radial nerve as in the prolonged use of crutches, extended leaning on the elbows, or regular upper body rope suspension. The colloquial terms for radial nerve palsy are derived from this cause.
- Correcting dislocated shoulders–Radial nerve palsy can result from the now discredited practice of correcting a dislocated shoulder by putting a foot in the person's armpit and pulling on the arm in attempts to slide the humerus back into the glenoid cavity of the scapula.
- Neuropathy in the hands and/or arms in patients with rheumatoid arthritis may in rare cases cause wrist drop. "When a joint swells, it can pinch the nerves of sensation that pass next to it. If the swelling irritates the nerve, either because of the inflammation or simply because of pressure, the nerve can send sensations of pain, numbness, and/or tingling to the brain. This is called nerve entrapment. Nerve entrapment most frequently occurs at the wrist (carpal tunnel syndrome) and elbow (ulnar nerve entrapment). A rare form of nerve disease in patients with rheumatoid arthritis that causes numbness and/or tingling is neuropathy. Neuropathy is nerve damage that in people with rheumatoid arthritis can result from inflammation of blood vessels (vasculitis)."

== Types ==
Types of wrist drop are distinguished by the nerves affected:

- Weakness of brachioradialis, wrist extension and finger flexion = radial nerve lesion
- Weakness of finger extension and radial deviation of the wrist on extension = posterior interosseous nerve lesion
- Weakness of triceps, finger extensors and flexors = c7,8 lesion
- General weakness of upper limb marked in deltoid, triceps, wrist extension and finger extension = corticospinal lesion

== Diagnosis ==
The workup for wrist drop frequently includes nerve conduction velocity studies to isolate and confirm the radial nerve as the source of the problem. Other screening tests include the inability to extend the thumb into a "hitchhiker's sign". Plain films can help identify bone spurs and fractures that may have injured the nerve. Sometimes MRI imaging is required to differentiate subtle causes.

== Treatment ==
Initial treatment includes splinting of the wrist for support, along with osteopathic medicine, physiotherapy and occupational therapy. In some cases, surgical removal of bone spurs or other anatomical defects that may be impinging on the nerve might be warranted. If the injury was the result of pressure from prolonged use of improperly fitted crutches or other similar mechanisms of injury, then the symptoms of wrist drop will most likely resolve spontaneously within 8–12 weeks.

== See also ==
- Radial neuropathy
