= Cheiralgia paresthetica =

- Other names: Wartenberg's syndrome
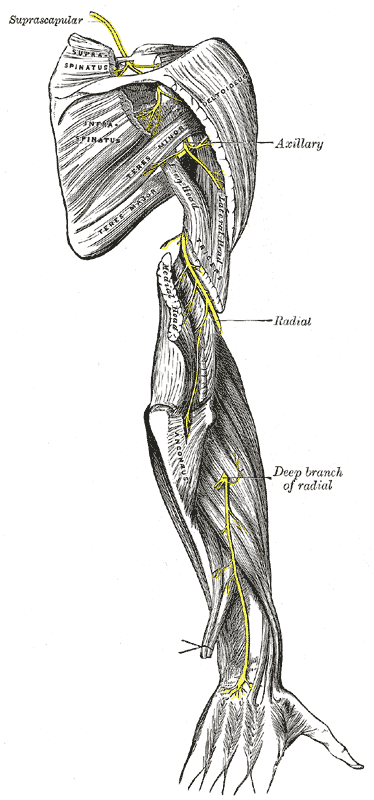
- Radial nerve
- Specialty: Neurology

Cheiralgia paraesthetica (Wartenberg's syndrome) is a neuropathy of the hand generally caused by compression or trauma to the superficial branch of the radial nerve. The area affected is typically on the back or side of the hand at the base of the thumb, near the anatomical snuffbox, but may extend up the back of the thumb and index finger and across the back of the hand. Symptoms include numbness, tingling, burning or pain. Since the nerve branch is sensory there is no motor impairment. It may be distinguished from de Quervain syndrome because it is not dependent on motion of the hand or fingers.

== Cause ==
The most common cause is thought to be constriction of the wrist, as with a bracelet or watchband (hence reference to "wristwatch neuropathy"). It is especially associated with the use of handcuffs and is therefore commonly referred to as handcuff neuropathy. Other injuries or surgery in the wrist area can also lead to symptoms, including surgery for other syndromes such as de Quervain's. The exact etiology is unknown, as it is unclear whether direct pressure by the constricting item is alone responsible, or whether edema associated with the constriction also contributes.

== Diagnosis ==
Symptoms commonly resolve on their own within several months when the constriction is removed; NSAIDs are commonly prescribed. In some cases a nerve decompression is required. The efficacy of cortisone and laser treatment is disputed. Permanent damage is possible.

== History ==
This neuropathy was first identified by Robert Wartenberg in a 1932 paper. Recent studies have focused on handcuff injuries due to the legal liability implications, but these have been hampered by difficulties in followup, particularly as large percentages of the study participants have been inebriated when they were injured. Diagnostically it is often subsumed into compression neuropathy of the radial nerve as a whole (e.g. ICD-9 354.3), but studies and papers continue to use the older term to distinguish it from more extensive neuropathies originating in the forearm.

== See also ==
- Radial neuropathy
