= Superficial branch of radial nerve =

Sensory nerve in the forearm

Superficial tree of the radial nerve
- Diagram of segmental distribution of the cutaneous nerves of the right upper extremity. Radial superficial is labeled at right.

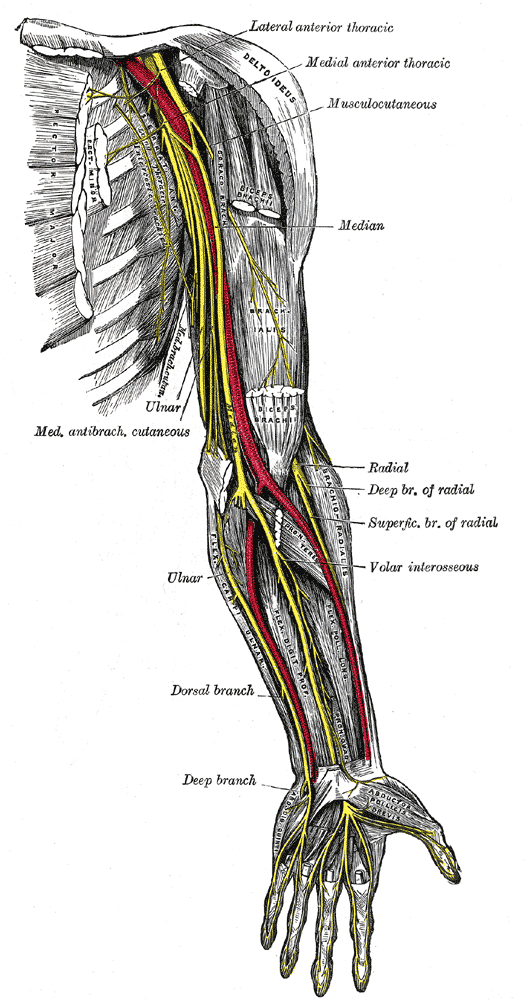
- Nerves of the left upper extremity.

Details
- From: Radial nerve

Identifiers
- Latin: ramus superficialis nervi radialis
- TA98: A14.2.03.056
- TA2: 6438
- FMA: 292885

The superficial branch of the radial nerve passes along the front of the radial side of the forearm to the commencement of its lower third. It is a sensory nerve.

It lies at first slightly lateral to the radial artery, concealed beneath the brachioradialis. In the middle third of the forearm, it lies behind the same muscle, close to the lateral side of the artery.

It quits the artery about 7 cm. above the wrist, passes beneath the tendon of the brachioradialis, and, piercing the deep fascia, divides into two branches: lateral and medial.

== Structure ==
=== Lateral branch ===
The lateral branch, the smaller, supplies the radial side of the thumb (by a digital nerve), the skin of the radial side and ball of the thumb, joining with the volar branch of the lateral antebrachial cutaneous nerve.

=== Medial branch ===
The medial branch communicates, above the wrist, with the dorsal branch of the lateral antebrachial cutaneous, and, on the back of the hand, with the dorsal branch of the ulnar nerve.

It then divides into four digital nerves, which are distributed as follows: the first supplies the ulnar side of the thumb; the second, the radial side of the index finger; the third, the adjoining sides of the index and middle fingers; the fourth communicates with a filament from the dorsal branch of the ulnar nerve, and supplies the adjacent sides of the middle and ring fingers.

== Clinical significance ==
The superficial branch of radial nerve is associated with an entrapment neuropathy called Wartenberg's syndrome. The nerve may be compressed due to wearing a tight wristband, watch or bracelet.

== Additional images ==
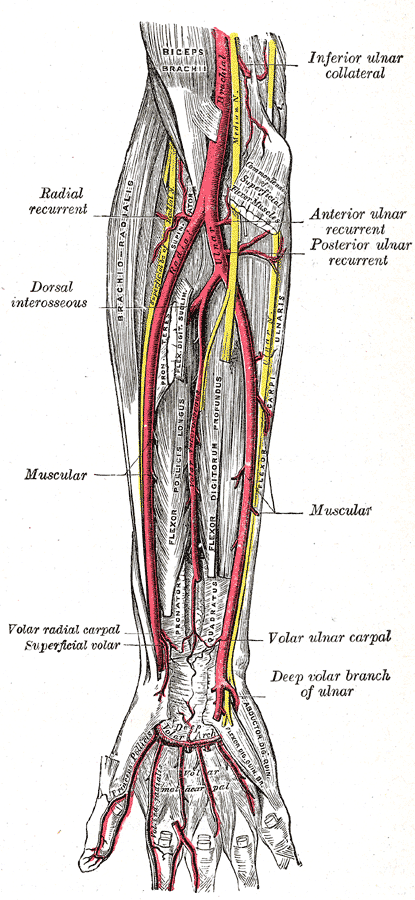
Ulnar and radial arteries. Deep view.

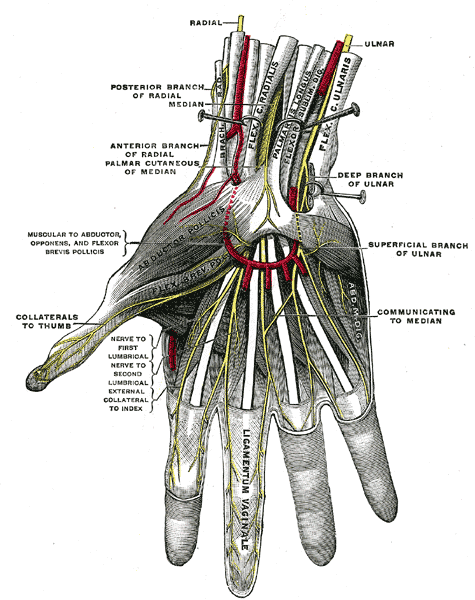
Superficial palmar nerves.

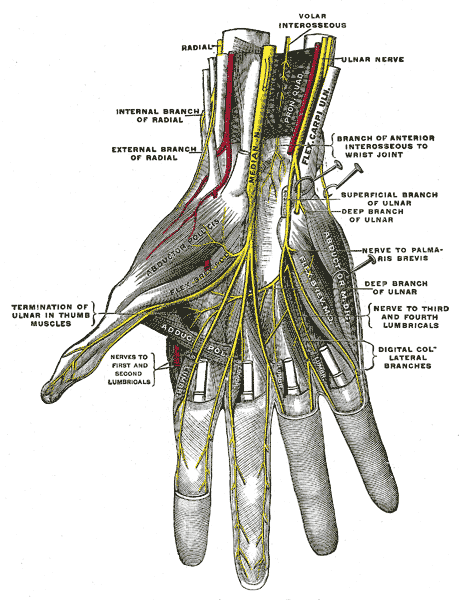
Deep palmar nerves.

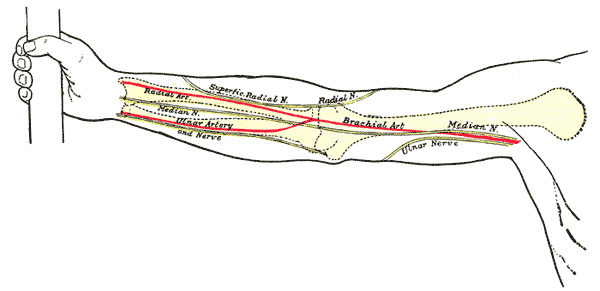
Front of right upper extremity, showing surface markings for bones, arteries, and nerves.
