= Crutch paralysis =

- Specialty: Neurology

Crutch paralysis is a form of paralysis which can occur when either the radial nerve or part of the brachial plexus, containing various nerves that innervate sense and motor function to the arm and hand, is under constant pressure, such as by the use of a crutch. This can lead to paralysis of the muscles innervated by the compressed nerve. Generally, crutches that are not adjusted to the correct height can cause the radial nerve to be constantly pushed against the humerus. This can cause any muscle that is innervated by the radial nerve to become partially or fully paralyzed. An example of this is wrist drop, in which the fingers, hand, or wrist is chronically in a flexed position because the radial nerve cannot innervate the extensor muscles due to paralysis. This condition, like other injuries from compressed nerves, normally improves quickly through therapy.

== See also ==
- Brachial plexus injury
