= Radial nerve =

Nerve in the human body that supplies the posterior portion of the upper limb

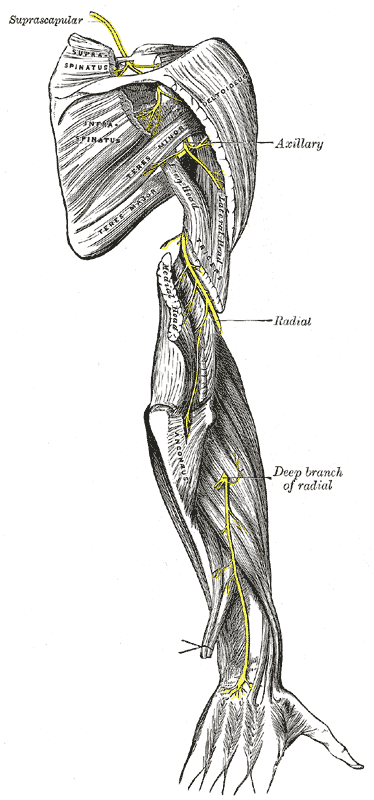
- The suprascapular, axillary, and radial nerves

Details
- From: Posterior cord
- To: Posterior interosseous nerve
- Innervates: Posterior compartment of the arm, posterior compartment of the forearm

Identifiers
- Latin: nervus radialis
- MeSH: D011826
- TA98: A14.2.03.049
- TA2: 6431
- FMA: 37069

The radial nerve is a nerve in the human body that supplies the posterior portion of the upper limb. It innervates the medial and lateral heads of the triceps brachii muscle of the arm, as well as all 12 muscles in the posterior osteofascial compartment of the forearm and the associated joints and overlying skin.

It originates from the brachial plexus, carrying fibers from the posterior roots of spinal nerves C5, C6, C7, C8 and T1.

The radial nerve and its branches provide motor innervation to the dorsal arm muscles (the triceps brachii and the anconeus) and the extrinsic extensors of the wrists and hands; it also provides cutaneous sensory innervation to most of the back of the hand, except for the back of the little finger and adjacent half of the ring finger (which are innervated by the ulnar nerve).

The radial nerve divides into a deep branch, which becomes the posterior interosseous nerve, and a superficial branch, which goes on to innervate the dorsum (back) of the hand.

This nerve was historically referred to as the musculospiral nerve.

== Structure ==
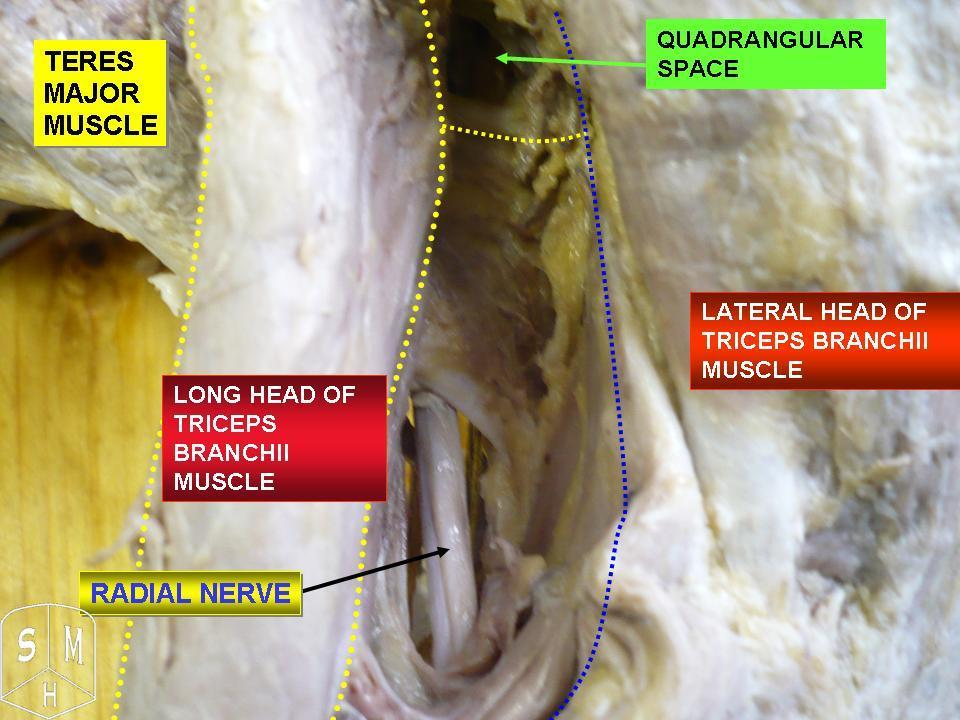
Radial nerve of the right axilla, posterior view

The radial nerve originates as a terminal branch of the posterior cord of the brachial plexus. It goes through the arm, first in the posterior compartment of the arm, and later in the anterior compartment of the arm, and continues in the posterior compartment of the forearm.

=== Arm ===
The radial nerve originates from the posterior cord of the brachial plexus with root values of C5 to C8 and T1. From the brachial plexus, it travels behind the third part of the axillary artery (part of the axillary artery distal to the pectoralis minor). In the arm, it runs behind the brachial artery and then enters the lower triangular space to reach the radial sulcus on the back of the humerus. It travels downwards together with profunda brachii artery, between the lateral and medial heads of triceps brachii until it reaches the lateral side the arm at 5 cm below the deltoid tuberosity where it pierces the lateral intermuscular septum to reach the anterior compartment of the arm. Then, it descends down to cross the lateral epicondyle of the humerus where the nerve terminates by branching itself into superficial and deep branch which continues into cubital fossa and then into the forearm.

The radial nerve gives out muscular branches to supply the long head, medial head, and lateral head of triceps brachii muscles before and during its course in the radial sulcus. After it emerges out from the radial sulcus, it supplies the brachialis, brachioradialis and extensor carpi radialis longus.

Above the radial sulcus, the radial nerve gives off posterior cutaneous nerve of the arm which supplies the skin at the back of the arm. In the radial sulcus, it gives off lower lateral cutaneous nerve of the arm and posterior cutaneous nerve of the forearm. The radial nerve also gives articular branches to supply the elbow joint.

=== Forearm and hand ===
In the forearm, it is divided into a superficial branch (primarily sensory) and a deep branch (primarily motor).

- The superficial branch of the radial nerve is widely separated from the radial artery in the upper one third of the forearm, closely related to radial artery in the middle third of the forearm, and in the lower third, it descends in the forearm under the tendon of brachioradialis. It crosses brachioradialis to enter posterior of forearm near the back of the wrist and supply dorsum of hand. It gives sensory supply to dorsal aspect of hand, dorsal aspect of thumb, index finger, middle finger and lateral side of ring finger except the nail beds, which are supplied by proper digital branches of median nerve.
- The deep branch of the radial nerve (also known as posterior interosseous nerve by some authors)) pierces the supinator muscle, winds around the radius under the cover of supinator to reach posterior of forearm where it again pierces supinator and after which it is known as the posterior interosseous nerve. It pierces the posterior extensor muscles and comes to lie between superficial and deep muscles of the back of the forearm. At the lower border of extensor pollicis brevis, it passes deep to the extensor pollicis longus and then run on the posterior interosseous membrane. It continues to move along with posterior interosseous artery (a deep branch of common interosseous artery which is a branch of ulnar artery), and ends as a pseudoganglion below extensor retinaculum by supplying the wrist and intercarpal joints.

=== Variation ===
It is commonly believed that the radial nerve provides motor innervation to the long head of the triceps. However, a study conducted in 2004 found that axillary nerve innervated the long head of the triceps in twenty cadavers without any supply from the radial nerve.

== Function ==
The following are branches of the radial nerve (including the superficial branch of the radial nerve and the deep branch of the radial nerve/posterior interosseous nerve).

=== Cutaneous ===
Cutaneous innervation of the right upper extremity. Areas innervated by the radial nerve are colored in pink.

Cutaneous innervation by the radial nerve is provided by the following nerve branches:

- Posterior cutaneous nerve of arm (originates in axilla)
- Inferior lateral cutaneous nerve of arm (originates in arm)
- Posterior cutaneous nerve of forearm (originates in arm)

The superficial branch of the radial nerve provides sensory innervation to much of the back of the hand, including the web of skin between the thumb and index finger.

=== Motor ===
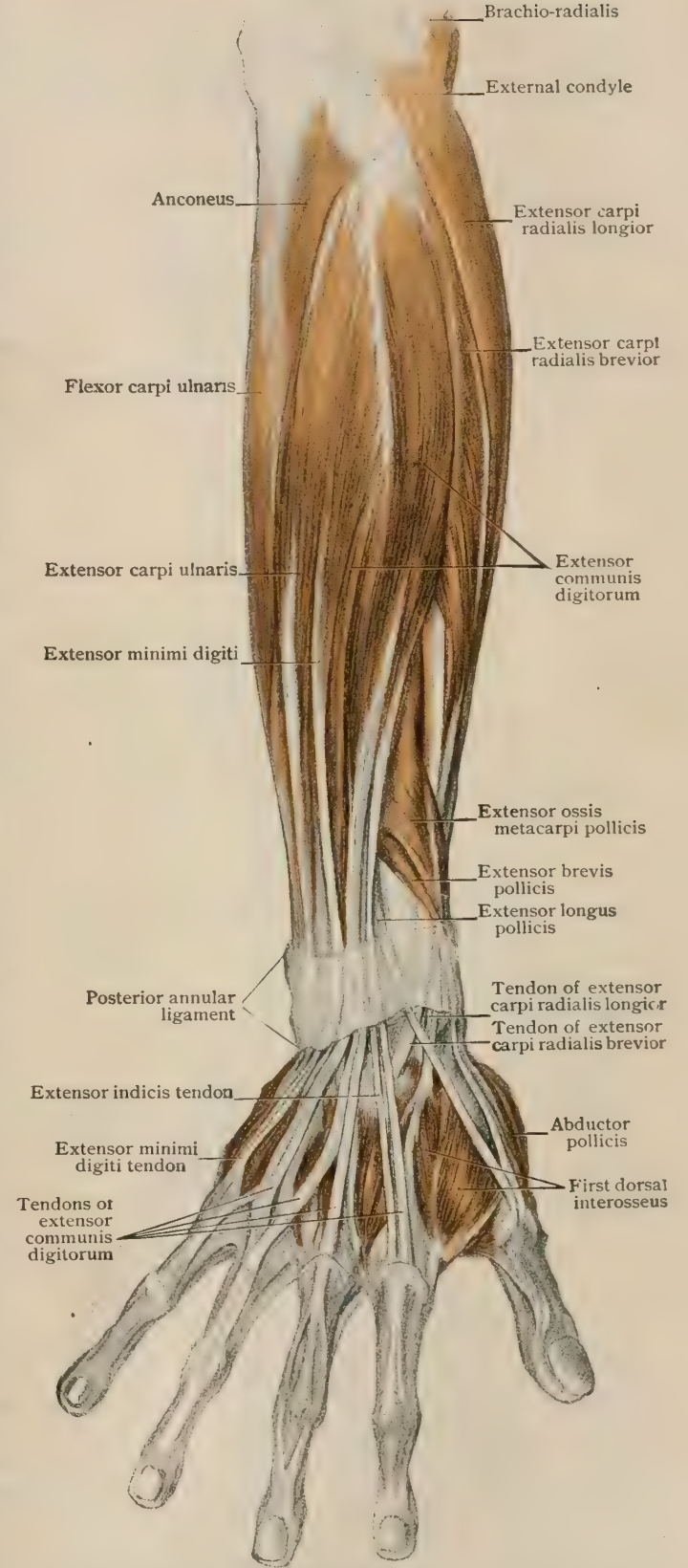
Muscles of the posterior forearm. All the labelled muscles (that is, all the visible muscles except the ones on the dorsal hand and one at top right) are innervated by the radial nerve, and represent all muscles innervated by the radial nerve except for the supinator.

Muscular branches of the radial nerve:

- Triceps brachii
- Anconeus
- Brachioradialis
- Extensor carpi radialis longus

Deep branch of the radial nerve:

- Extensor carpi radialis brevis
- Supinator

Posterior interosseous nerve (a continuation of the deep branch after the supinator):

- Extensor digitorum
- Extensor digiti minimi
- Extensor carpi ulnaris
- Abductor pollicis longus
- Extensor pollicis brevis
- Extensor pollicis longus
- Extensor indicis

The radial nerve (and its deep branch) provides motor innervation to the muscles in the posterior compartment of the arm and forearm, which are mostly extensors.

== Clinical significance ==
=== Injury ===
Injury to the radial nerve at different levels causes different syndromes with varying motor and sensory deficits.

At the axilla

- Common mechanisms of injury: Saturday night palsy, crutch palsy, lesions
- Motor deficit:
  - Loss of extension of forearm, weakness of supination, and loss of extension of hand and fingers.
  - Presence of wrist drop, due to inability to extend the hand and fingers.
- Sensory deficit: Loss of sensation in lateral arm, posterior forearm, the radial half of dorsum of hand, and dorsal aspect of radial 3 1/2 digits, excluding their nail beds.

At mid-arm

- Common mechanism of injury: Mid-shaft humeral fracture
- Motor deficit:
  - Weakness of supination, and loss of extension of hand and fingers.
  - Presence of wrist drop, due to inability to extend the hand and fingers.
- Sensory deficit: Loss of sensation in posterior forearm, the radial half of dorsum of hand, and dorsal aspect of radial 3 1/2 digits, excluding their nail beds.

Just below the elbow

- Common mechanism of injury: Neck of radius fracture, elbow dislocation or fracture, tight cast, rheumatoid nodules, injections due to tennis elbow, injuring the deep branch of the radial nerve that pierces the radial head, causing posterior interosseous nerve syndrome
- Motor deficit:
  - Weakness in extension of hand and loss of extension of fingers.
  - Presence of finger drop, and partial wrist drop, since the extensor carpi radialis longus and brachioradialis muscles are working.
- Sensory deficit: None, as sensation is supplied by the superficial radial nerve
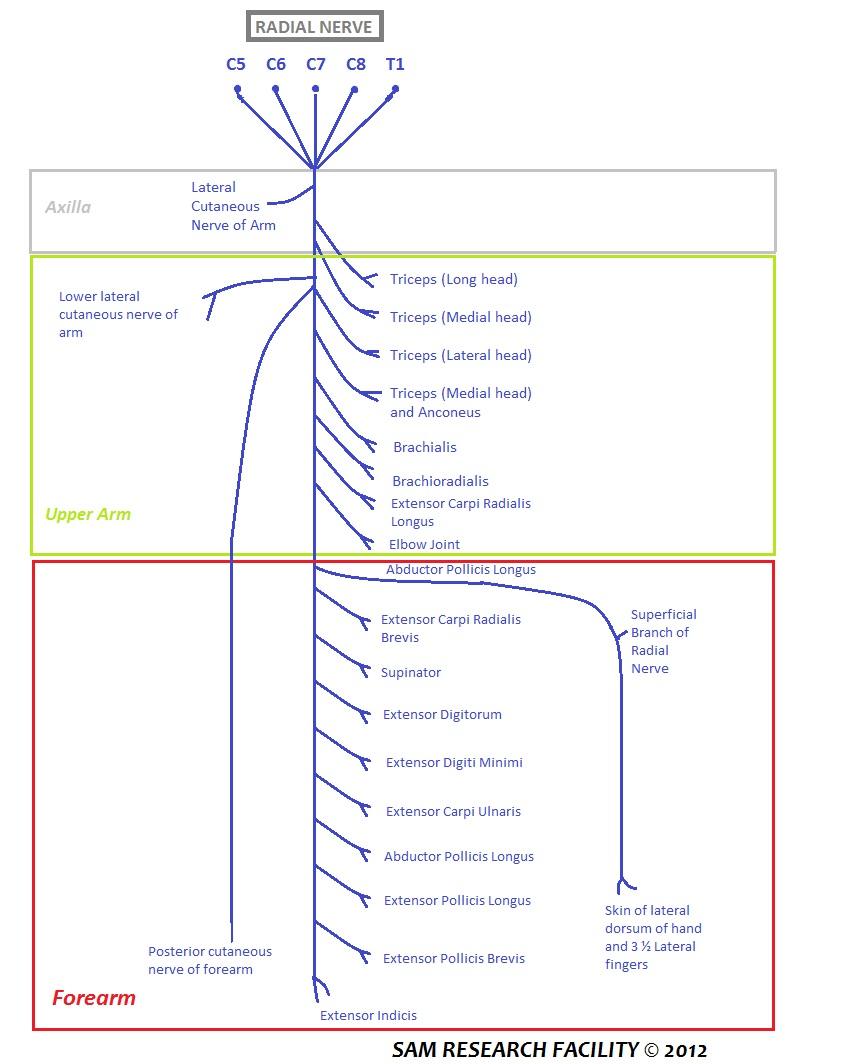
  Radial nerve

Within the distal forearm:

- Common mechanism of injury: Wartenberg's syndrome (not to be confused with Wartenberg's sign), due to nerve entrapment beneath the tendinous insertion of brachioradialis, tight jewellery, and watch bands.
- Motor deficit: None
- Sensory deficit: Numbness and tingling in radial half of dorsum of hand, and dorsal aspect of radial 3 1/2 digits, excluding their nail beds.
- In Wartenberg's syndrome, there is significant radial wrist pain, and close resemblance to symptoms in de Quervain's tenosynovitis. Finkelstein's test may be positive.

== Additional images ==
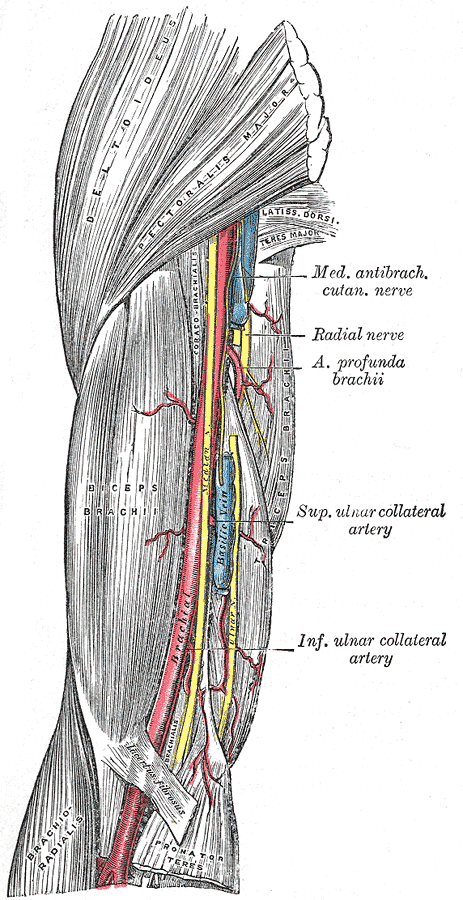
The brachial artery

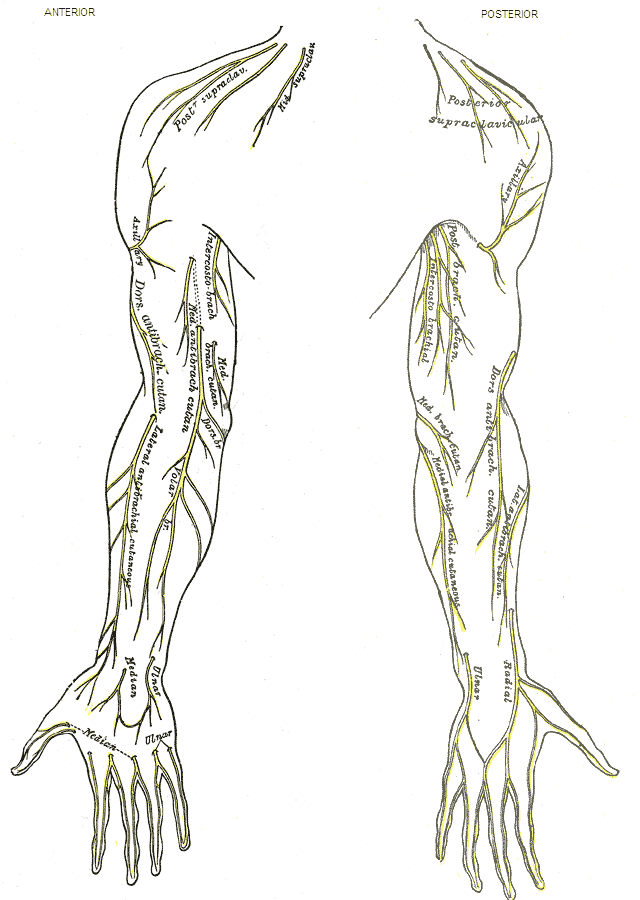
Cutaneous nerves of right upper extremity

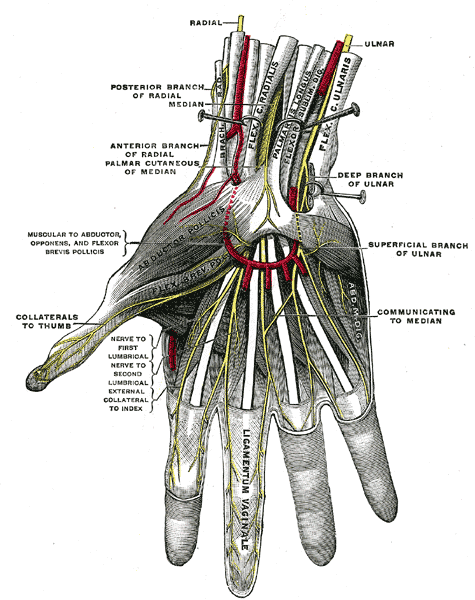
Superficial palmar nerves

Front of right upper extremity, showing surface markings for bones, arteries, and nerves

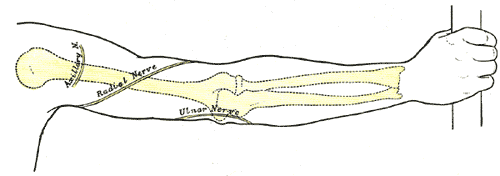
Back of right upper extremity, showing surface markings for bones and nerves

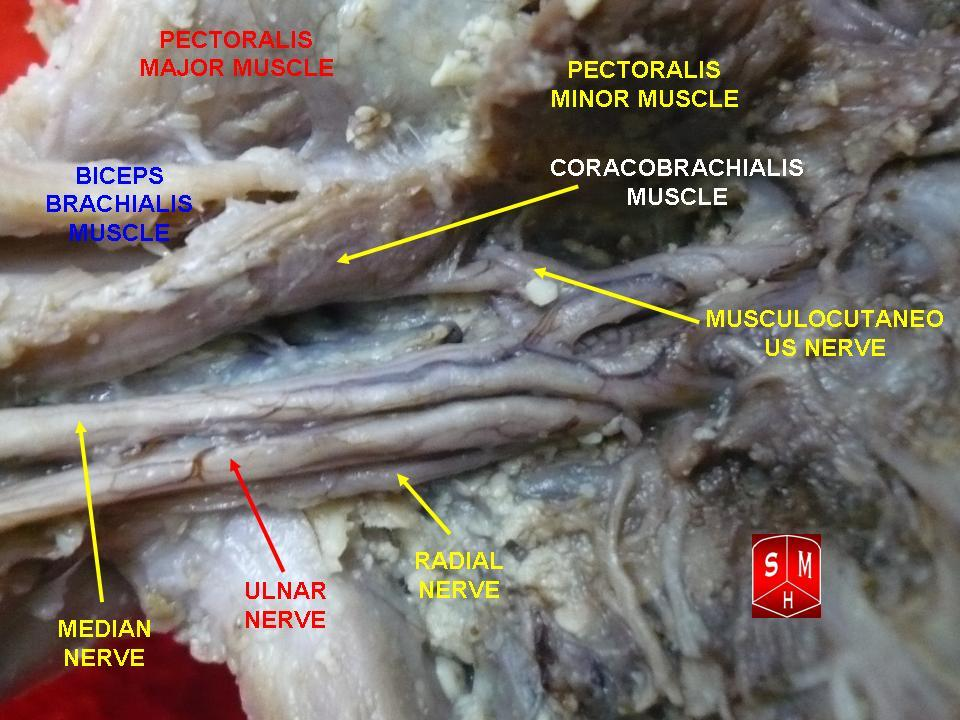
Radial nerve at newborn

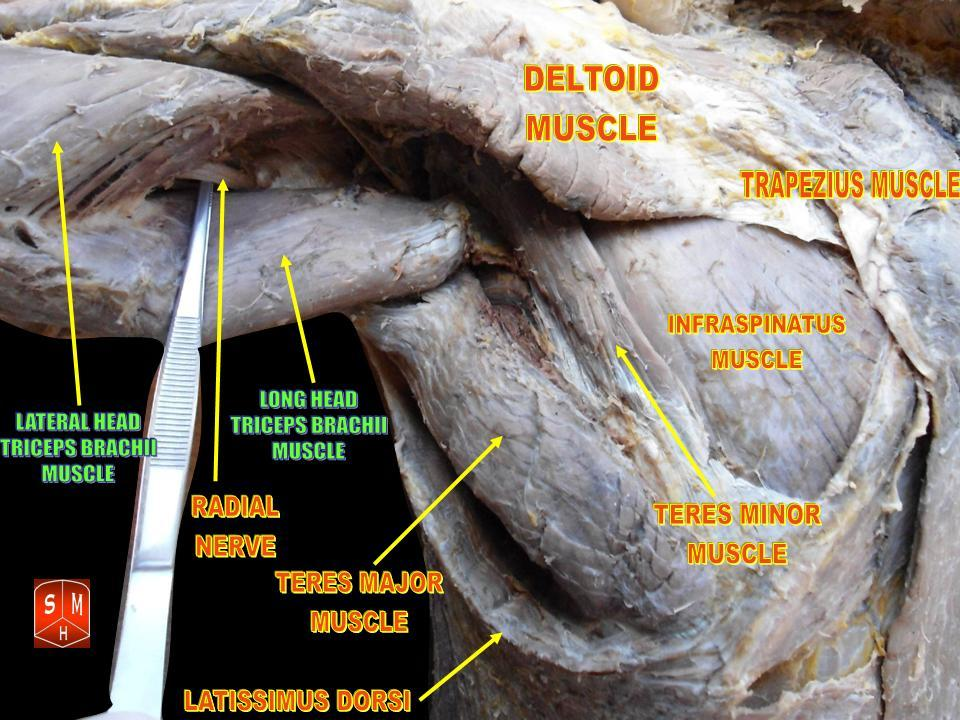
Radial nerve

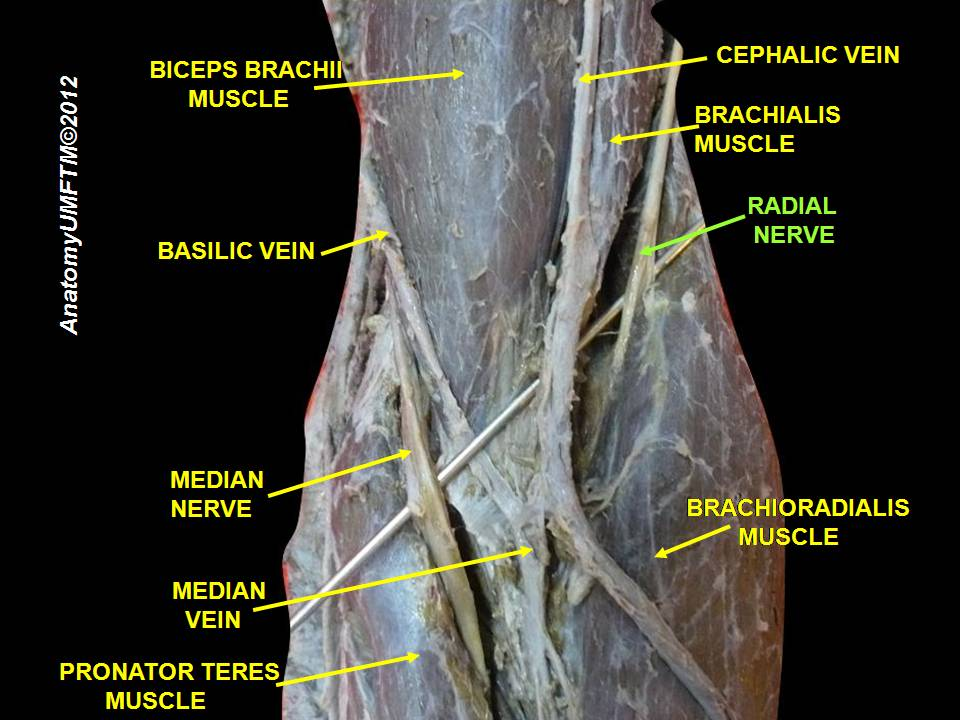
Radial nerve

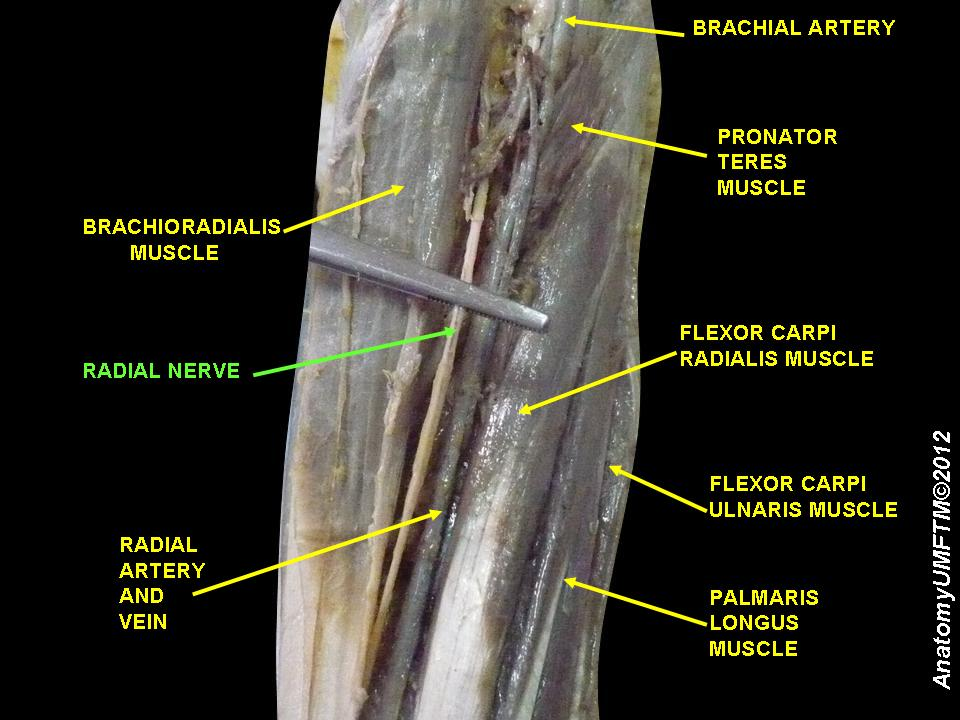
Radial nerve

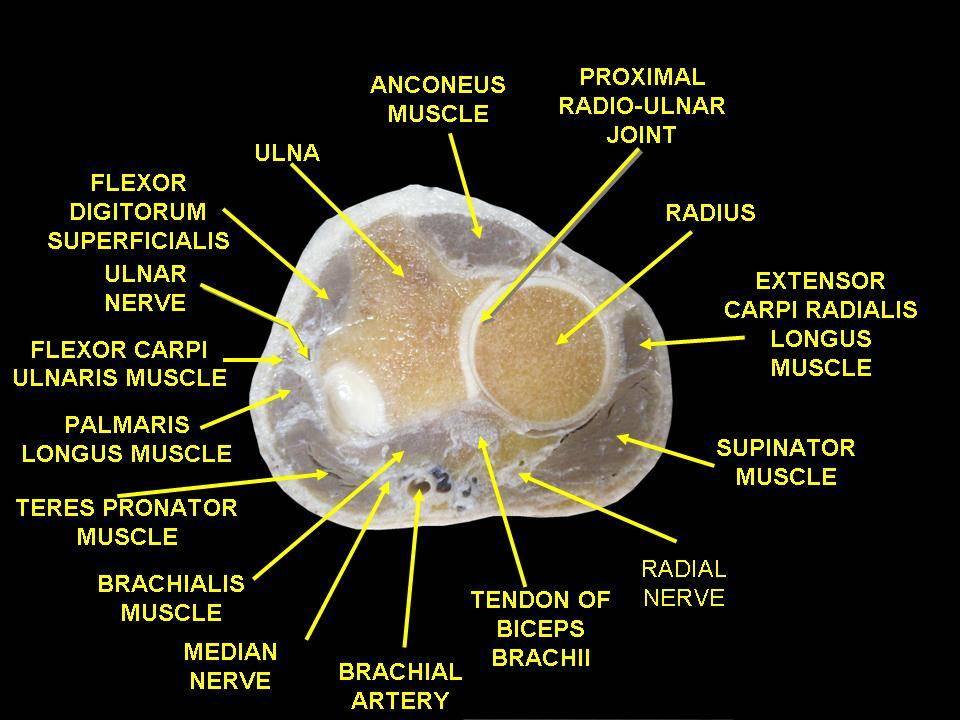
Muscles of upper limb. Cross section.

== See also ==
- Arcade of Frohse
- Muscular branches of the radial nerve
- Posterior brachial cutaneous nerve
- Dorsal antibrachial cutaneous nerve
- Superficial branch of the radial nerve
- Deep branch of the radial nerve
- Radial neuropathy
- Radial tunnel syndrome
