= Radial neuropathy =

Human disease

- Other names: Radial mononeuropathy, Saturday night palsy
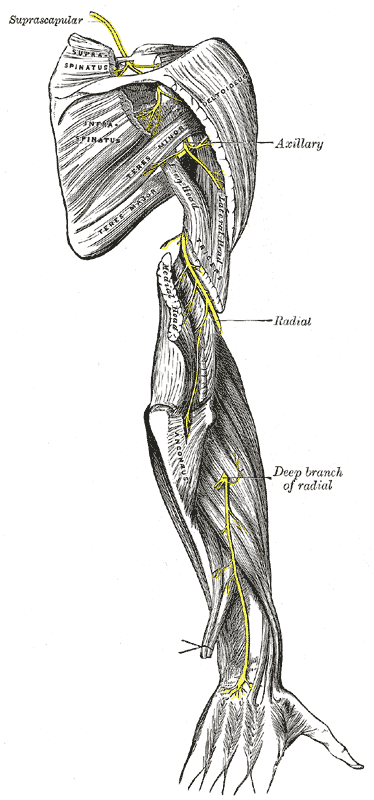
- The suprascapular, axillary, and radial nerves.
- Specialty: Neurology
- Symptoms: Wrist drop
- Causes: Broken bone, Direct nerve injury
- Diagnostic method: MRI, Ultrasound
- Treatment: Corticosteroid, Pain medication

Radial neuropathy is a type of mononeuropathy which results from acute trauma to the radial nerve that extends the length of the arm. It is known as transient paresthesia when sensation is temporarily abnormal.

== Signs and symptoms ==
Symptoms of radial neuropathy vary depending on the severity of the trauma; however, common symptoms may include wrist drop, numbness on the back of the hand and wrist, and inability to voluntarily straighten the fingers. Loss of wrist extension is due to loss of the ability to move the posterior compartment of forearm muscles. In the event of lacerations to the wrist area the symptom would therefore be sensory. Additionally, depending on the type of trauma, other nerves may be affected, such as the median nerve and axillary nerves.

== Causes ==
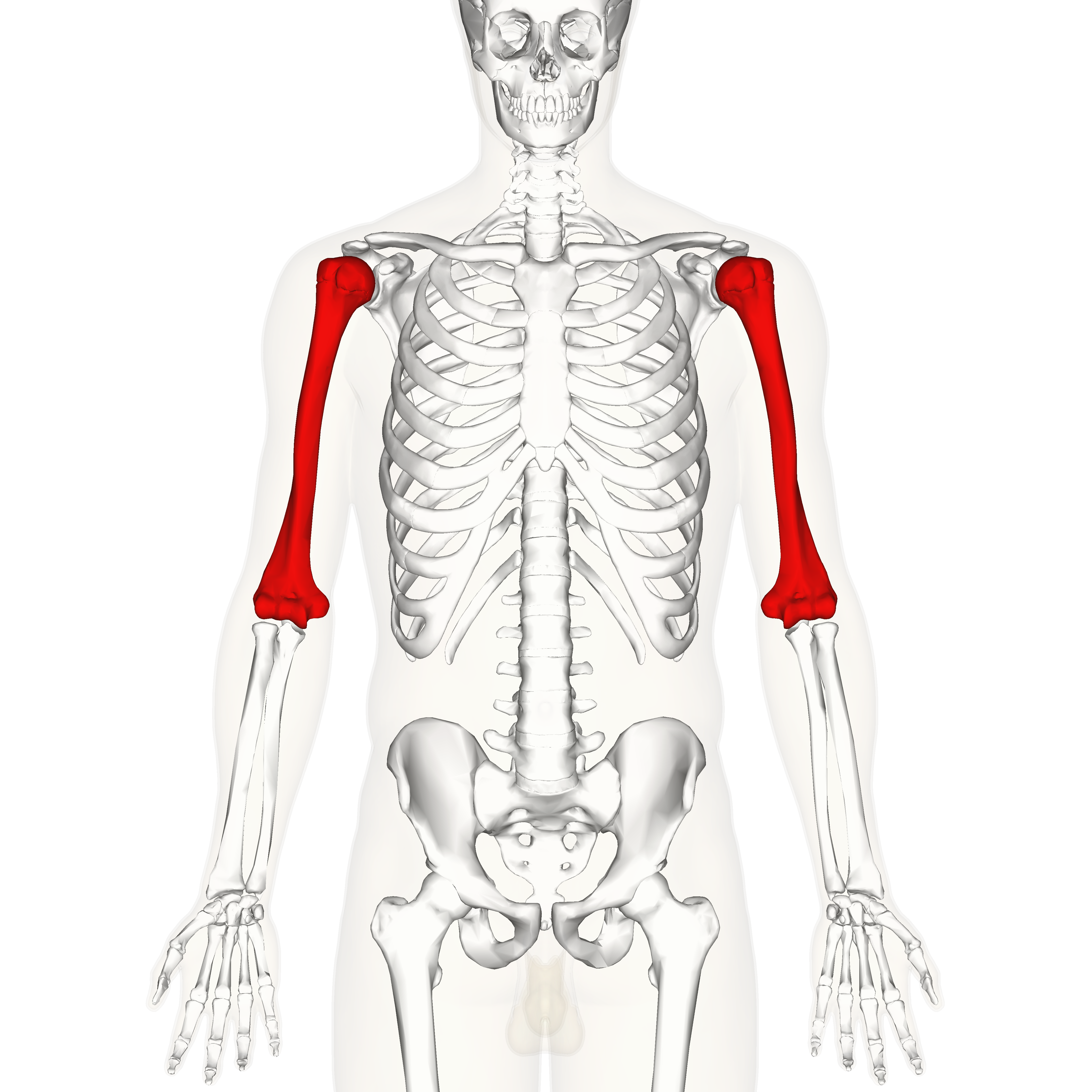
Humerus - anterior view

There are many ways to acquire radial nerve neuropathy, including:

- Upper arm - a fracture of the bone
- Elbow - entrapment of the nerve
- Wrist - elbow deformity and soft-tissue masses
- Axilla - here the most common cause is compression. However, a dislocation of the humerus is a possible factor as well. It could also be due to brachial plexus compression.

== Mechanism ==
The mechanism of radial neuropathy is such that it can cause focal demyelination and axonal degeneration. These would be caused via laceration or compression of the nerve in question.

== Diagnosis ==
Radial neuropathy may be diagnosed using MRI, ultrasound, nerve conduction study or electromyography (EMG).

== Treatment ==
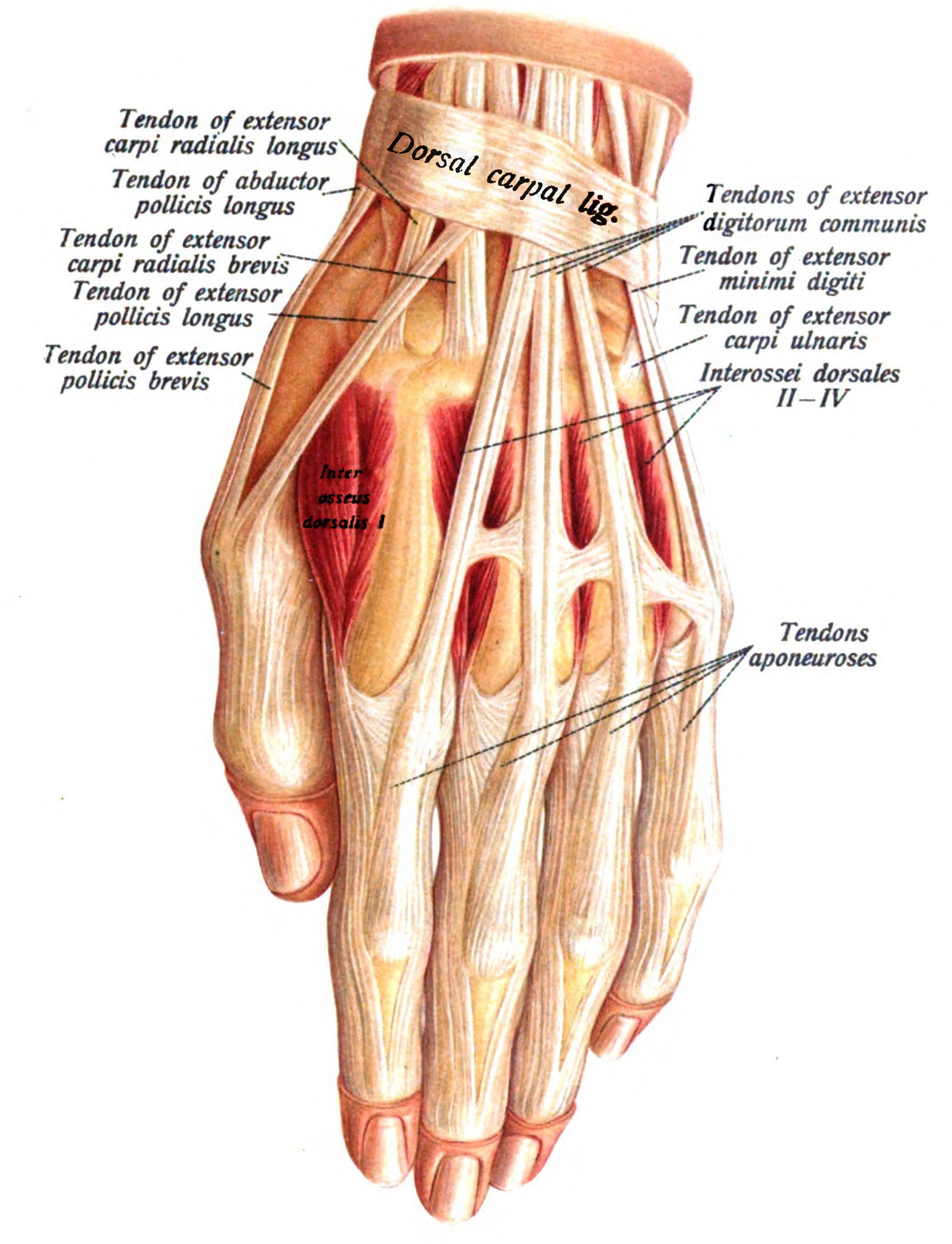
Hand tendons

The treatment and management of radial neuropathy can be achieved via the following methods:

- Physical therapy or occupational therapy
- Surgery (depending on the specific area and extent of damage)
- Tendon transfer (the origin remains the same, but the insertion is moved)
- Splinting

== Prognosis ==
Radial neuropathy is not necessarily permanent, though there could be partial loss of movement or sensation. Complications may include hand deformity in some individuals. If the injury is axonal (the underlying nerve fiber itself is damaged), recovery may take months or years, and full recovery may never occur. EMG and nerve conduction studies are typically performed to diagnose the extent and distribution of the damage, and to help with prognosis for recovery.. A compressive neuropraxia of the radial nerve (Saturday night palsy) takes between 2 and 12 weeks to recover. It is a common misunderstanding to attribute severe motor weakness of the hand lasting only minutes to hours to radial nerve neuropraxia

== Culture and society ==
There are several terms used to describe radial nerve injuries, which are dependent on the causation factor, such as:

- Honeymoon palsy from another individual sleeping on and compressing one's arm overnight.
- Saturday night palsy from falling asleep with one's arm hanging over the armrest of a chair or the edge of the bed, compressing the radial nerve.
- Saturnine palsy from lead poisoning
- Squash palsy, from traction forces associated with the sport squash, happens to squash players during periods between matches.

== See also ==
- Crutch paralysis
- Peripheral neuropathy
