= Extensor pollicis longus muscle =

Skeletal muscle of the human forearm

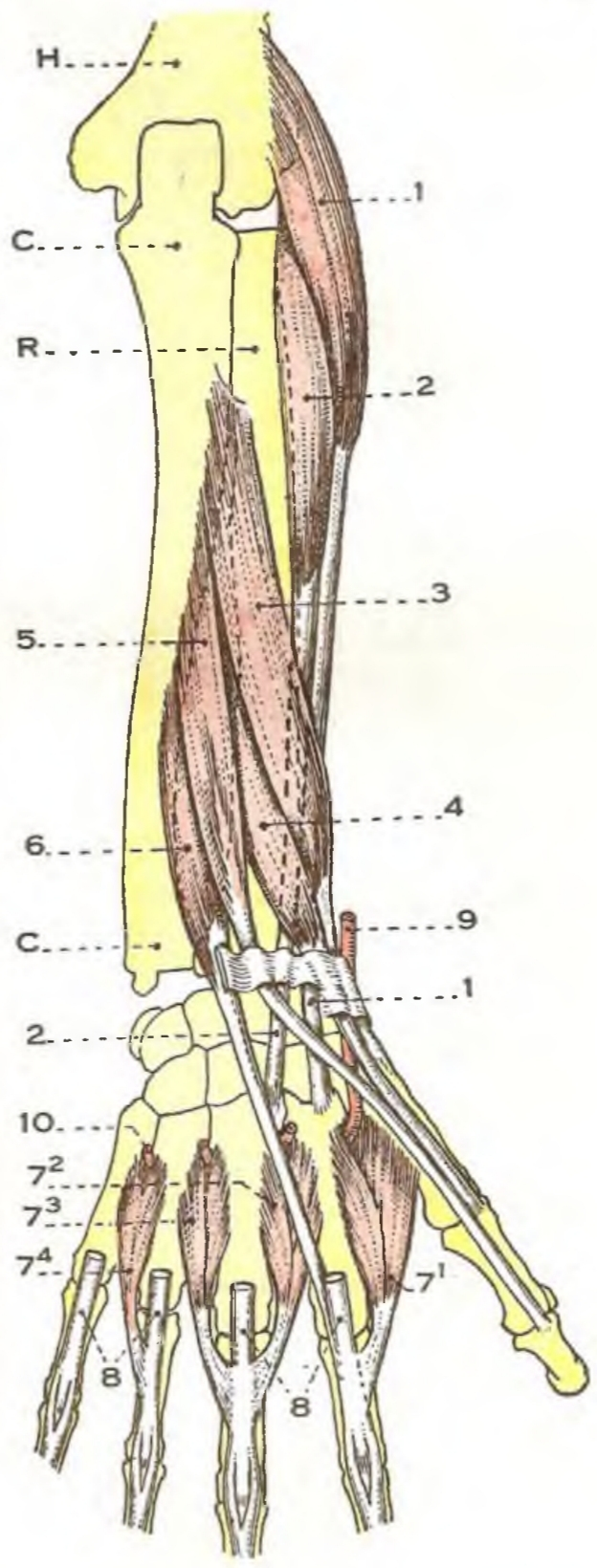
- Posterior aspect of the right forearm and hand. Deep muscles. Extensor pollicis longus is labeled 5. Extensor pollicis brevis is labeled 4. (After Testut's Anatomy.)

Details
- Origin: Middle third of posterior surface of ulna, interosseous membrane
- Insertion: Thumb, distal phalanx
- Artery: Posterior interosseous artery
- Nerve: Posterior interosseous nerve (branching from the radial nerve)
- Actions: Extension of the thumb (metacarpophalangeal and interphalangeal)
- Antagonist: Flexor pollicis longus muscle, flexor pollicis brevis muscle

Identifiers
- Latin: musculus extensor pollicis longus
- TA98: A04.6.02.051
- TA2: 2516
- FMA: 38521

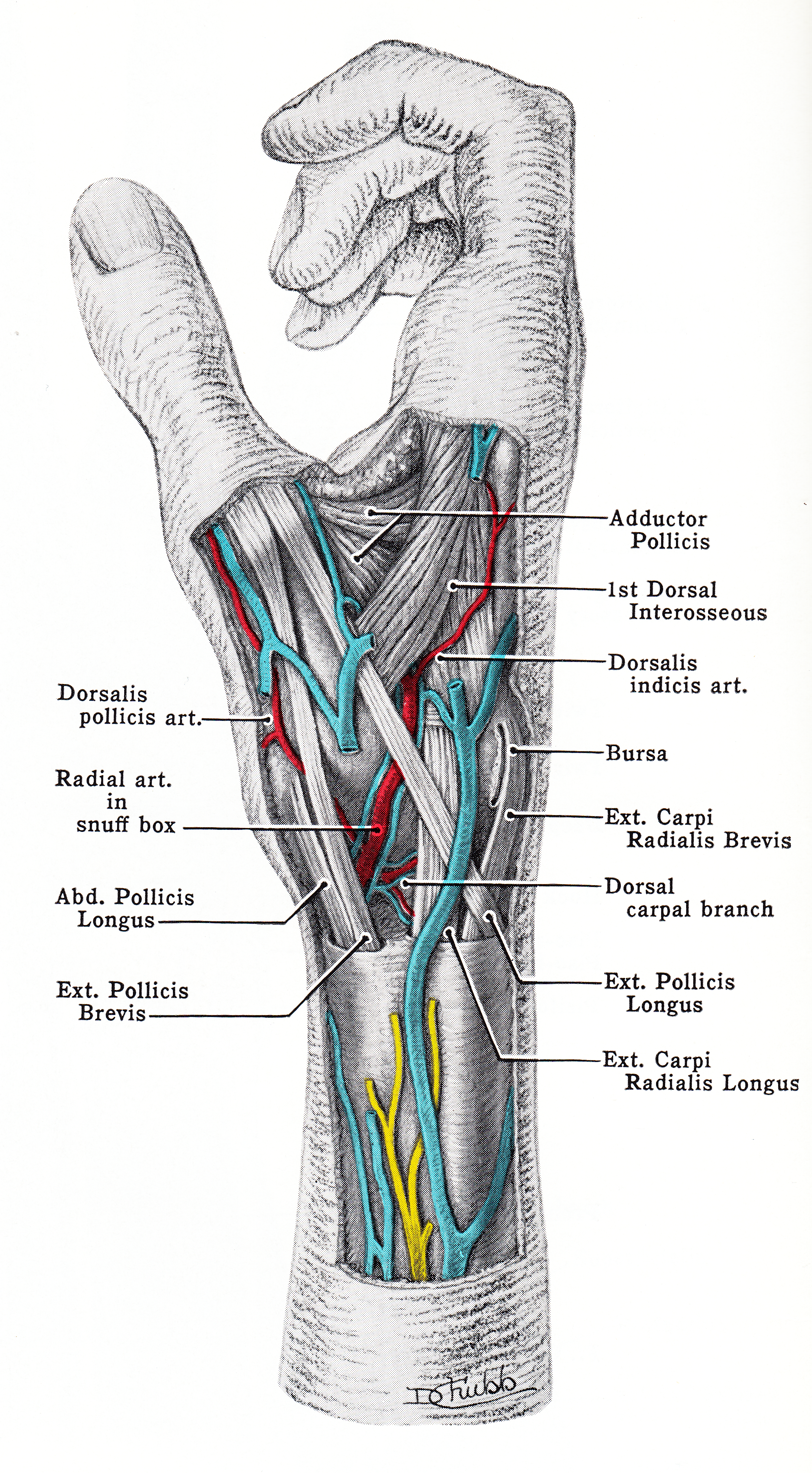
The extensor pollicis longus tendon at the anatomical snuffbox

In human anatomy, the extensor pollicis longus muscle (EPL) is a skeletal muscle located dorsally on the forearm. It is much larger than the extensor pollicis brevis, the origin of which it partly covers and acts to stretch the thumb together with this muscle.

== Structure ==
The extensor pollicis longus arises from the dorsal surface of the ulna and from the interosseous membrane, next to the origins of abductor pollicis longus and extensor pollicis brevis.

Passing through the third tendon compartment, lying in a narrow, oblique groove on the back of the lower end of the radius, it crosses the wrist close to the dorsal midline before turning towards the thumb using Lister's tubercle on the distal end of the radius as a pulley.

It obliquely crosses the tendons of the extensores carpi radialis longus and brevis, and is separated from the extensor pollicis brevis by a triangular interval, the anatomical snuff box in which the radial artery is found.

At the proximal phalanx, the tendon is joined by expansions from abductor pollicis brevis and adductor pollicis.

The tendon is finally inserted on the base of the distal phalanx of the thumb.

6.7 to 9.7 centimetres (2.6 to 3.8 in) in length, the tendon passes through a long and superficial synovial sheath which, passing obliquely from the radial border of the forearm into the thumb, extends from the proximal border of the extensor retinaculum to the first carpometacarpal joint. In the synovial sheath a proximal and a distal mesotendon connect the tendon to the floor of the sheath.

=== Relations ===
Together with the tendons of the extensor pollicis brevis and the abductor pollicis longus, its tendon crosses the radial artery.

=== Blood supply ===
The tendon of extensor pollicis longus is supplied by branches from various arteries. Before the tendon enters its synovial sheath, arteries from the anterior interosseous artery or its muscular branches enter the tendon. The sheath itself is supplied by the posterior ramus of the same artery. In the metacarpal region, beyond the synovial sheath, the tendon is supplied directly from the radial artery. At the phalanges, the tendon forms a dorsal aponeurosis which is supplied by a digital branch of the first dorsal metacarpal artery.

=== Innervation ===
The extensor pollicis longus muscle receives innervation from the posterior interosseous nerve (C7 and C8) which is the continuation of the deep branch of the radial nerve.

== Function ==
Extensor pollicis longus extends the terminal phalanx of the thumb. While abductor pollicis brevis and adductor pollicis, both attached to the extensor pollicis longus tendon, can extend the thumb's interphalangeal joint to the neutral position, only extensor pollicis longus can achieve full hyperextension at the interphalangeal joint. This complete extension at the interphalangeal joint is not possible, or considerably more difficult, with the carpal, carpometacarpal, and metacarpophalangeal joints simultaneously extended. Likewise, flexion at the interphalangeal joint by flexor pollicis longus is considerably reduced in wrist flexion.

It also applies an extensor force at the metacarpophalangeal joint together with the extensor pollicis brevis and extends and adducts at the carpometacarpal joint of the thumb.

== Clinical significance ==
=== Injury ===
Tenosynovitis, inflammatory irritation of the synovial sheath, is relatively common in the third compartment after repetitive activities such as drum playing.

== Additional images ==
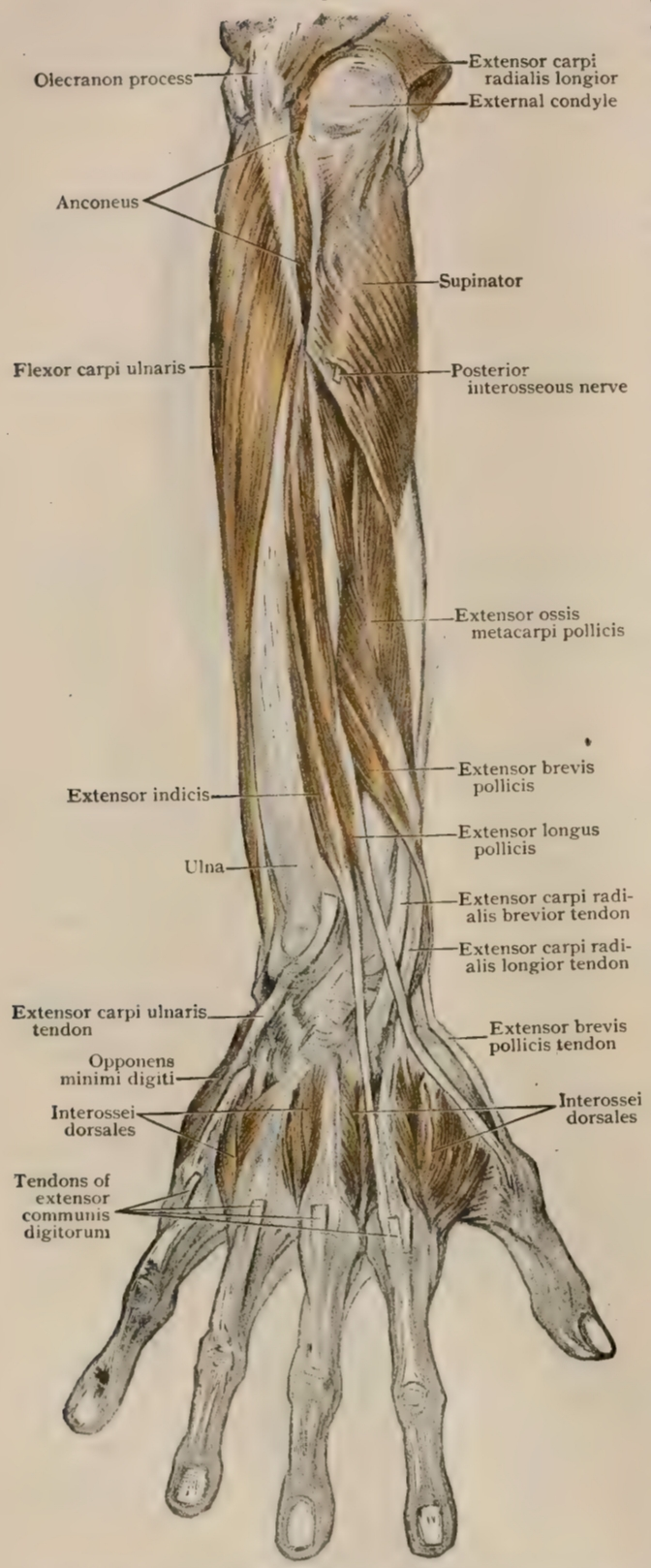
Posterior aspect of the right-sided forearm and hand. Deep muscles. Note the extensor pollicis longus. (After Piersol's Anatomy.)

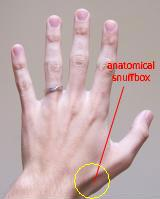
Anatomical snuff box

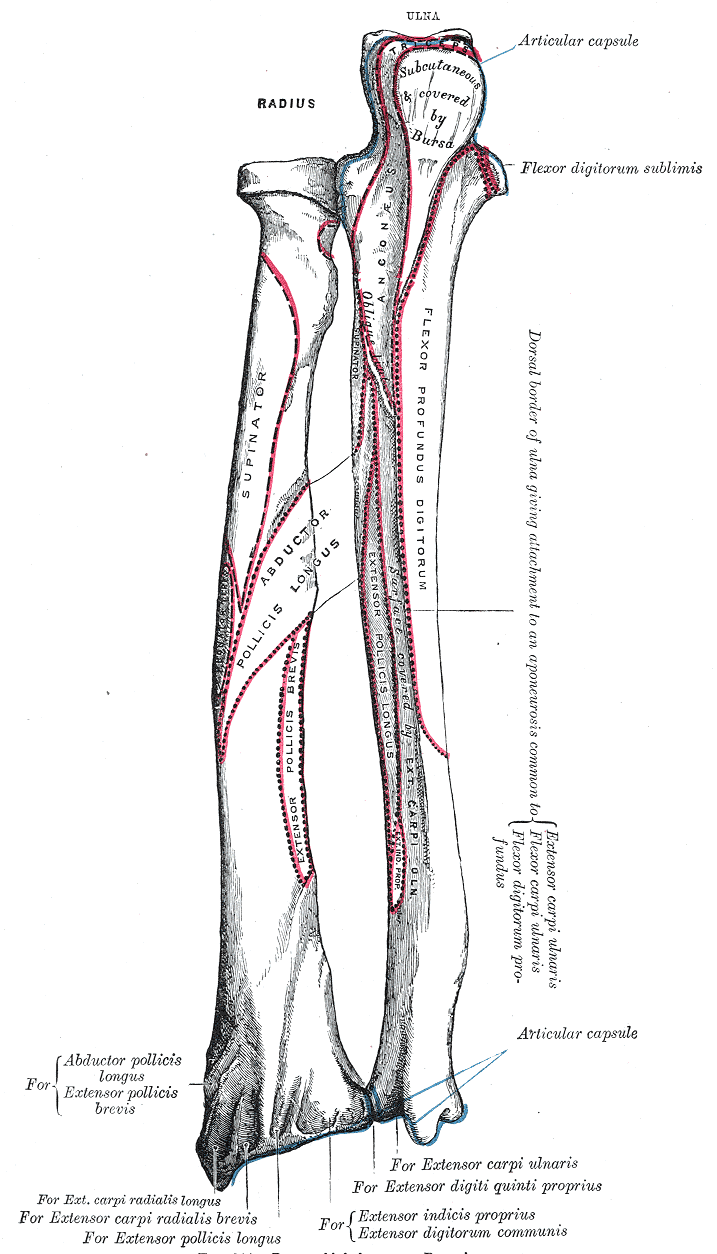
Bones of left forearm. Posterior aspect.

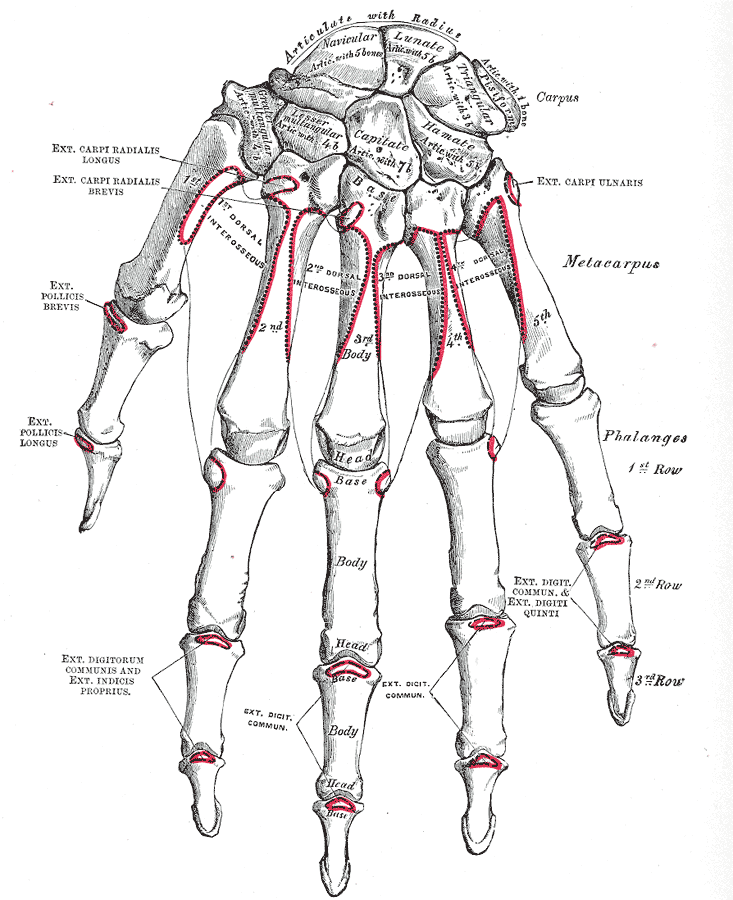
Bones of the left hand. Dorsal surface.

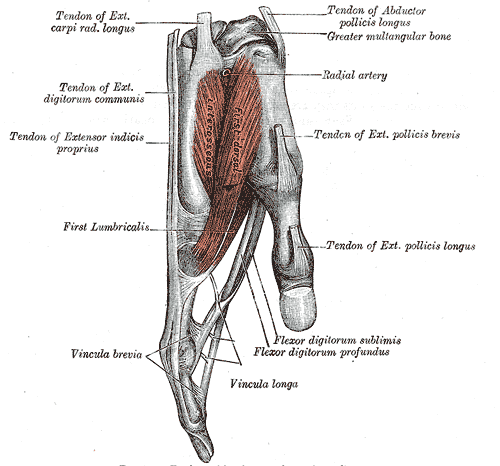
Tendons of forefinger and vincula tendina.

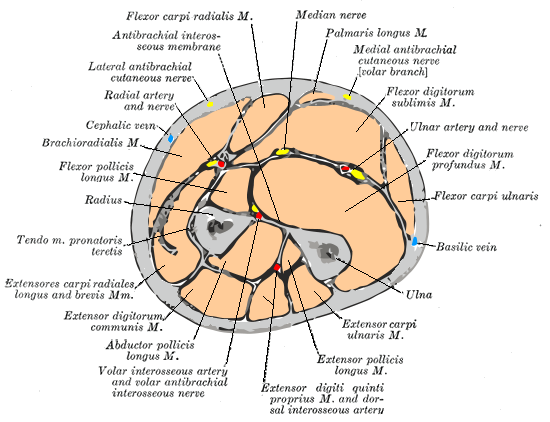
Cross-section through the middle of the forearm.

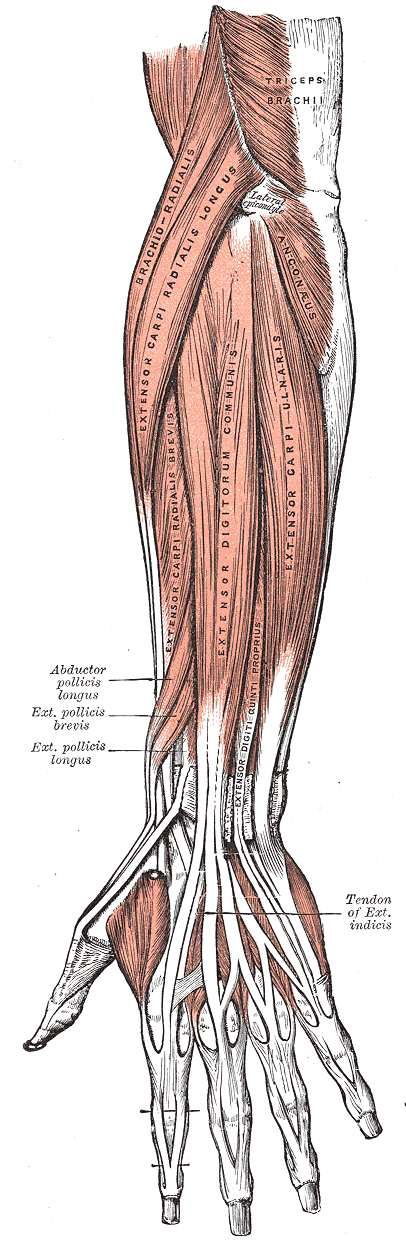
Posterior surface of the forearm. Superficial muscles.

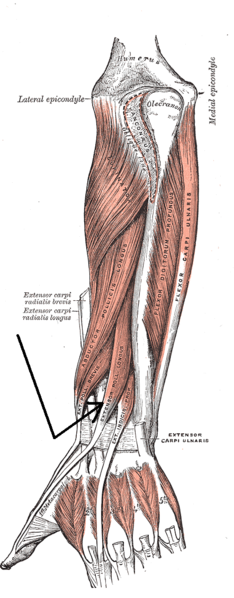
Posterior surface of the forearm. Deep muscles.

Transverse section across the wrist and digits.

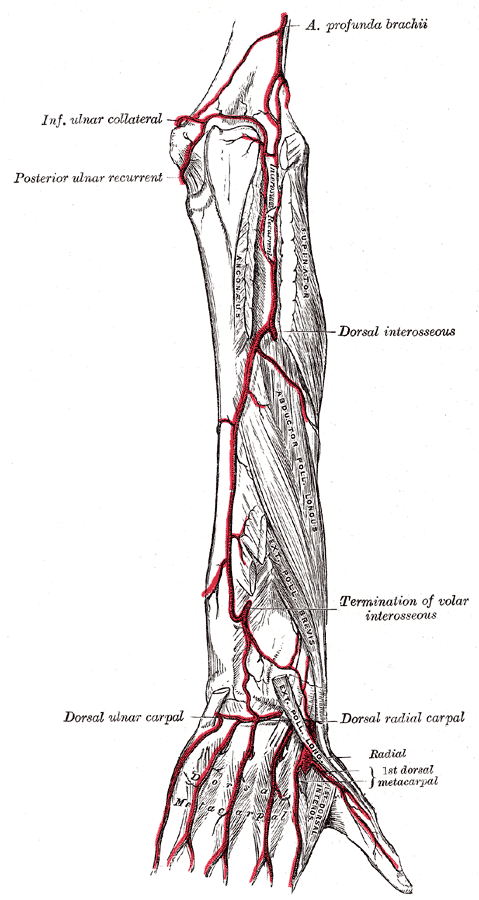
Arteries of the back of the forearm and hand.

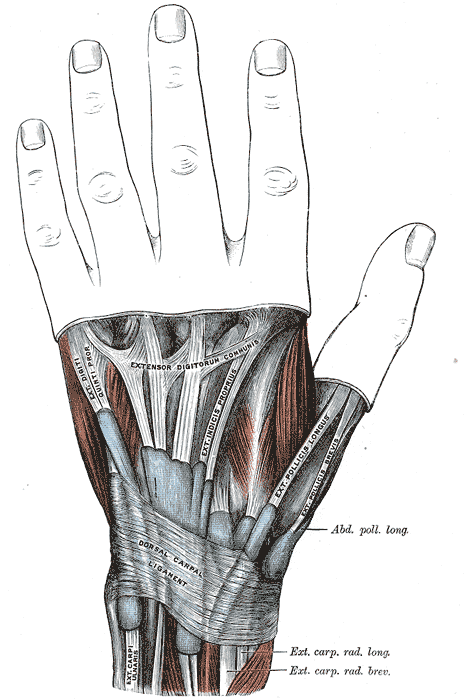
The mucous sheaths of the tendons on the back of the wrist. (Extensor pollicis longus visible at center right.)

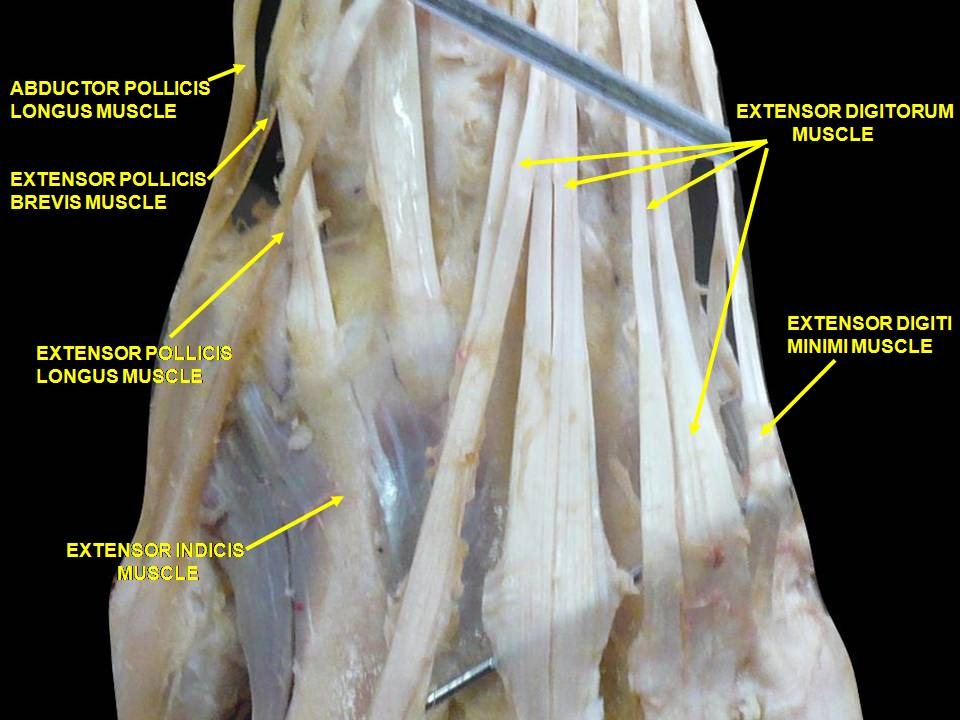
Muscle of the hand . Posterior view.
