= Extensor pollicis brevis muscle =

Forearm muscle which moves the thumb

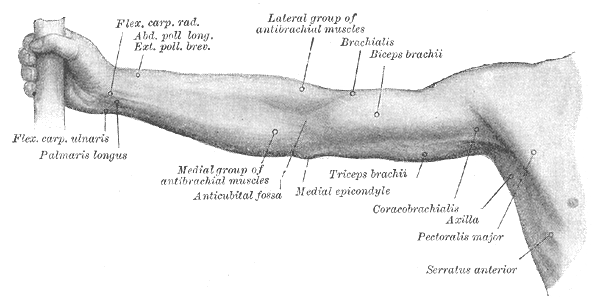
- Front of right upper extremity. (Extensor pollicis brevis labeled at upper left.)

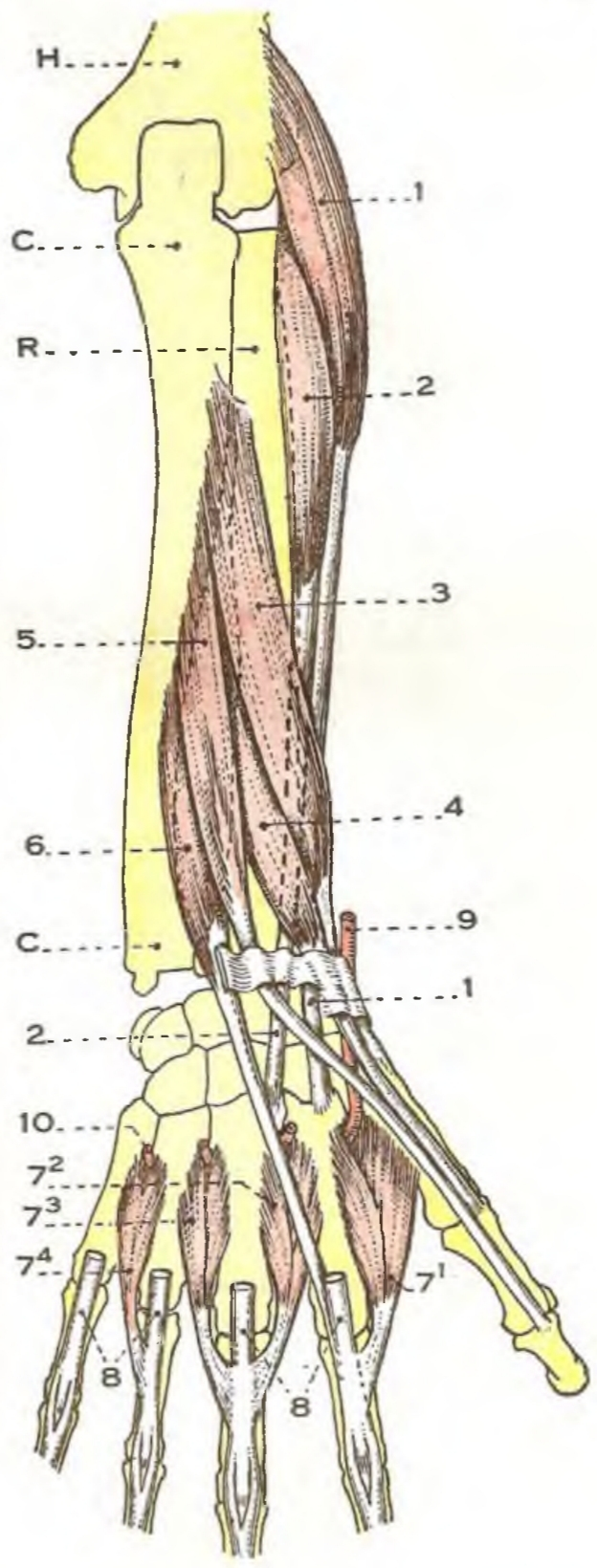
- Posterior surface of the forearm and hand (right upper limb). Deep muscles. Extensor pollicis brevis is labeled 4. Extensor pollicis longus is labeled 5. (After Testut's Anatomy.)

Details
- Origin: Radius and the Interosseous membrane
- Insertion: Thumb, proximal phalanx
- Artery: Posterior interosseous artery
- Nerve: Posterior interosseous nerve
- Actions: Extension of thumb at metacarpophalangeal joint
- Antagonist: Flexor pollicis longus muscle, flexor pollicis brevis muscle

Identifiers
- Latin: musculus extensor pollicis brevis
- TA98: A04.6.02.050
- TA2: 2518
- FMA: 38518

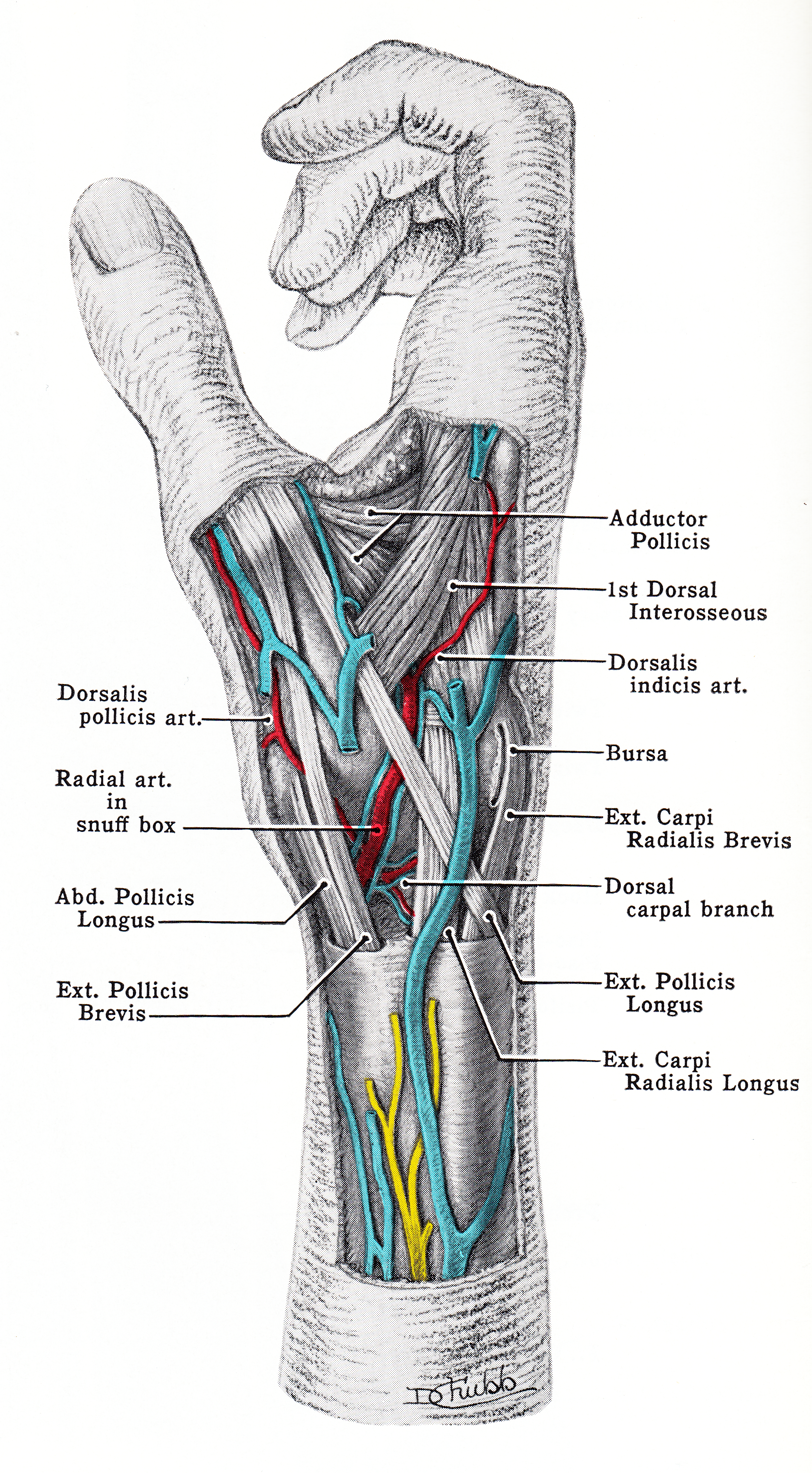
United tendons of the abductor pollicis longus and extensor pollicis brevis at the anatomical snuffbox

In human anatomy, the extensor pollicis brevis (EPB) is a skeletal muscle on the dorsal side of the forearm. It lies on the medial side of, and is closely connected with, the abductor pollicis longus. The extensor pollicis brevis belongs to the deep group of the posterior fascial compartment of the forearm. It is a part of the lateral border of the anatomical snuffbox.

== Structure ==
The extensor pollicis brevis arises from the ulna distal to the abductor pollicis longus, from the interosseous membrane, and from the dorsal surface of the radius.

Its direction is similar to that of the abductor pollicis longus, its tendon passing the same groove on the lateral side of the lower end of the radius, to be inserted into the base of the first phalanx of the thumb.

=== Variation ===
Absence; fusion of tendon with that of the extensor pollicis longus or abductor pollicis longus muscle.

== Function ==
In a close relationship to the abductor pollicis longus, the extensor pollicis brevis both extends and abducts the thumb at the carpometacarpal and metacarpophalangeal joints.

== Additional images ==
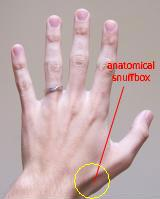
Anatomical snuff box

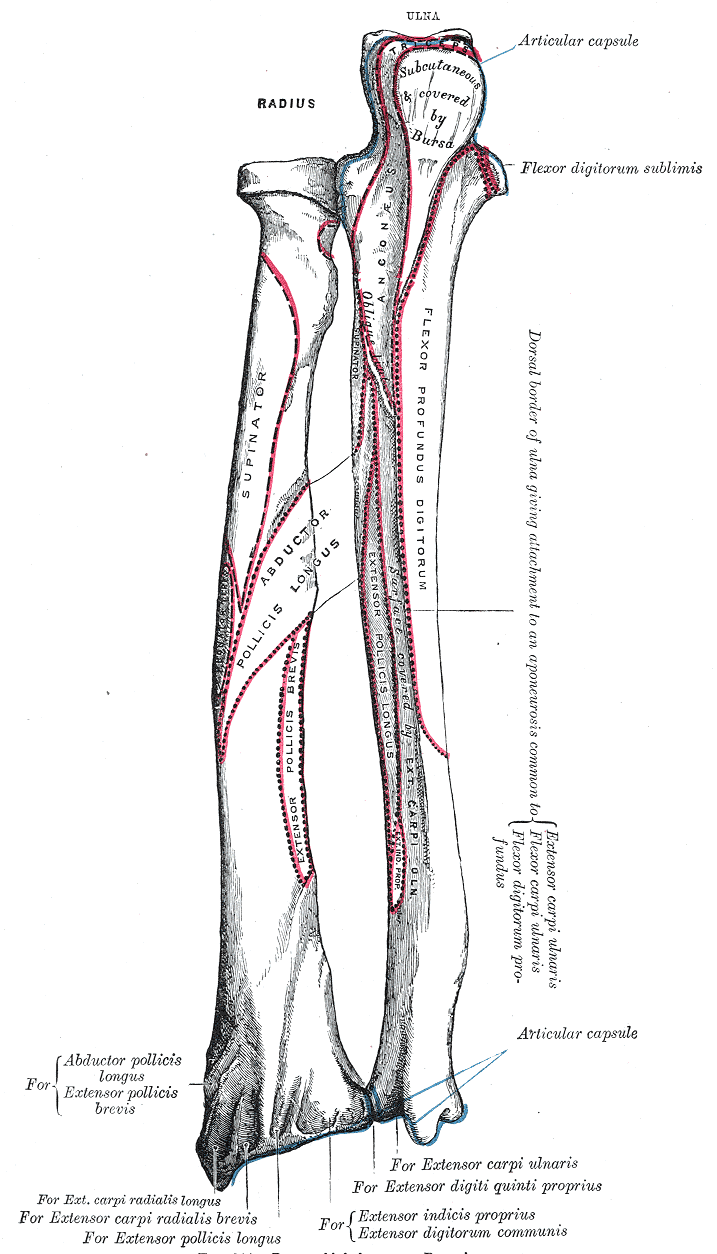
Bones of left forearm. Posterior aspect.

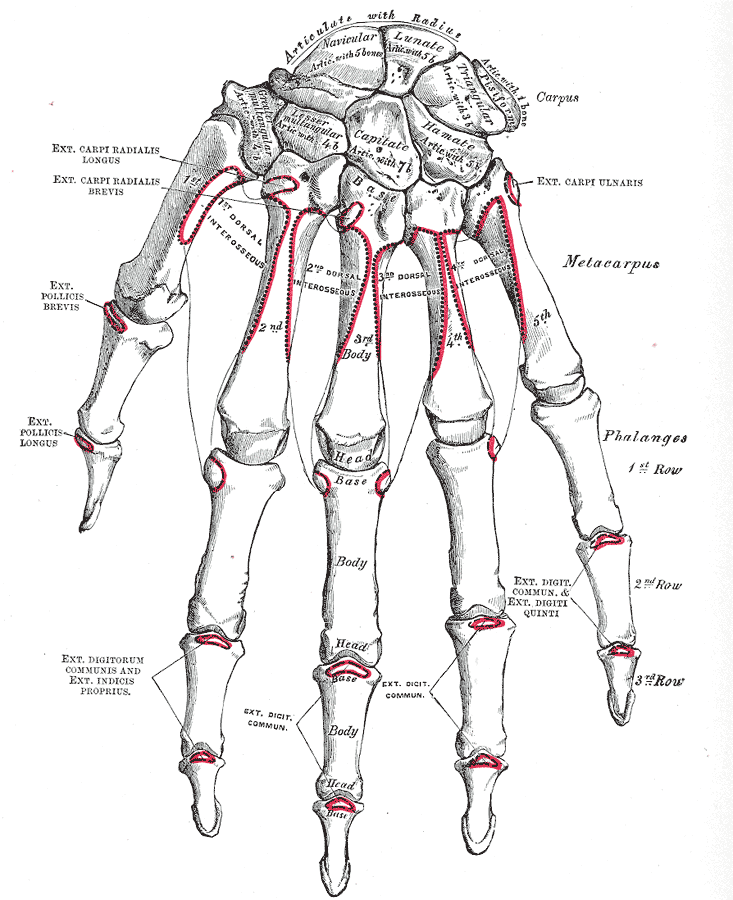
Bones of the left hand. Dorsal surface.

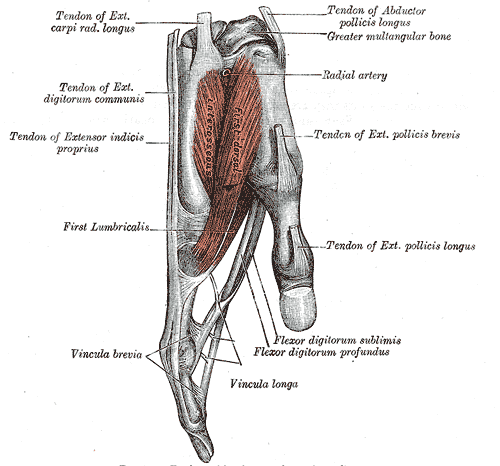
Tendons of forefinger and vincula tendina.

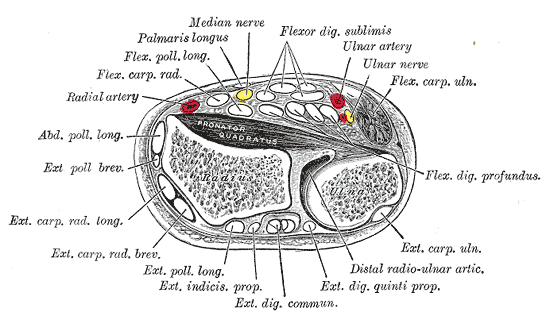
Transverse section across distal ends of radius and ulna.

Transverse section across the wrist and digits.

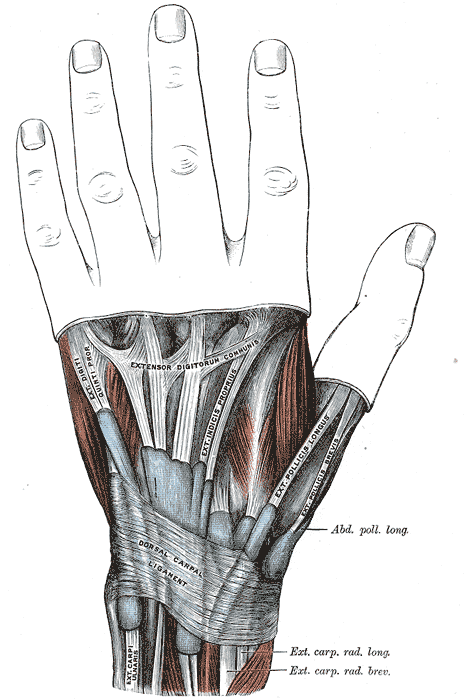
The mucous sheaths of the tendons on the back of the wrist.

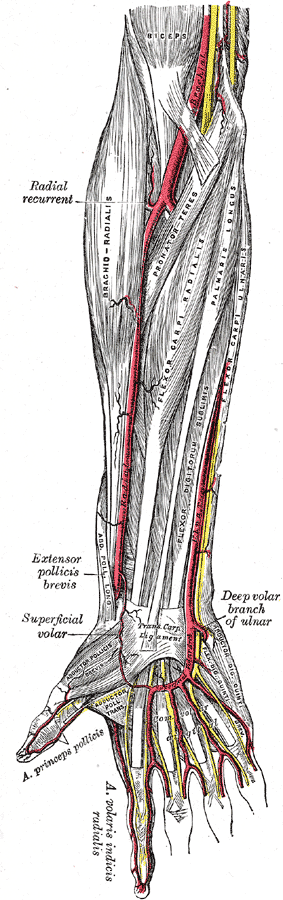
The radial and ulnar arteries.

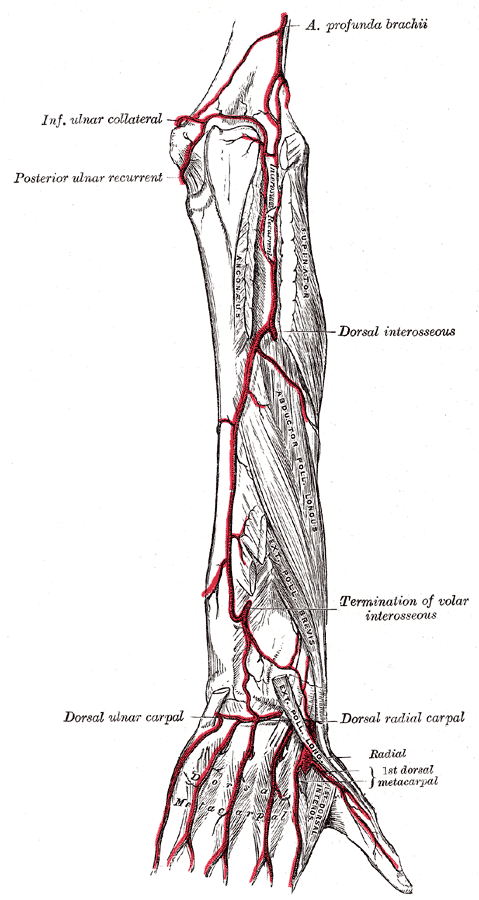
Arteries of the back of the forearm and hand.

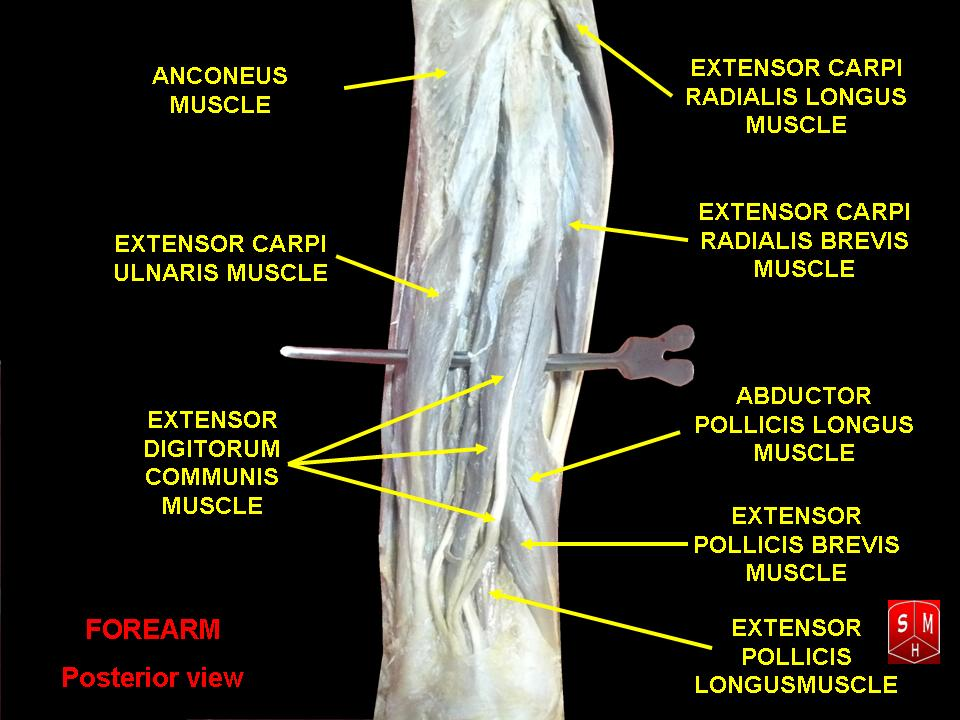
Extensor carpi radialis brevis muscle

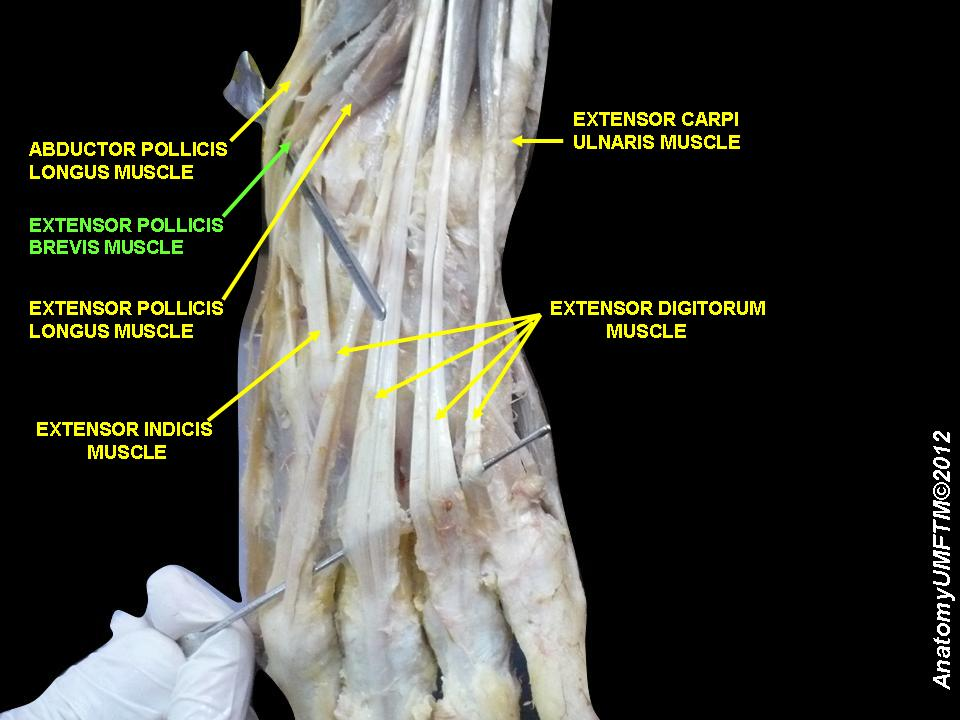
Extensor pollicis brevis muscle

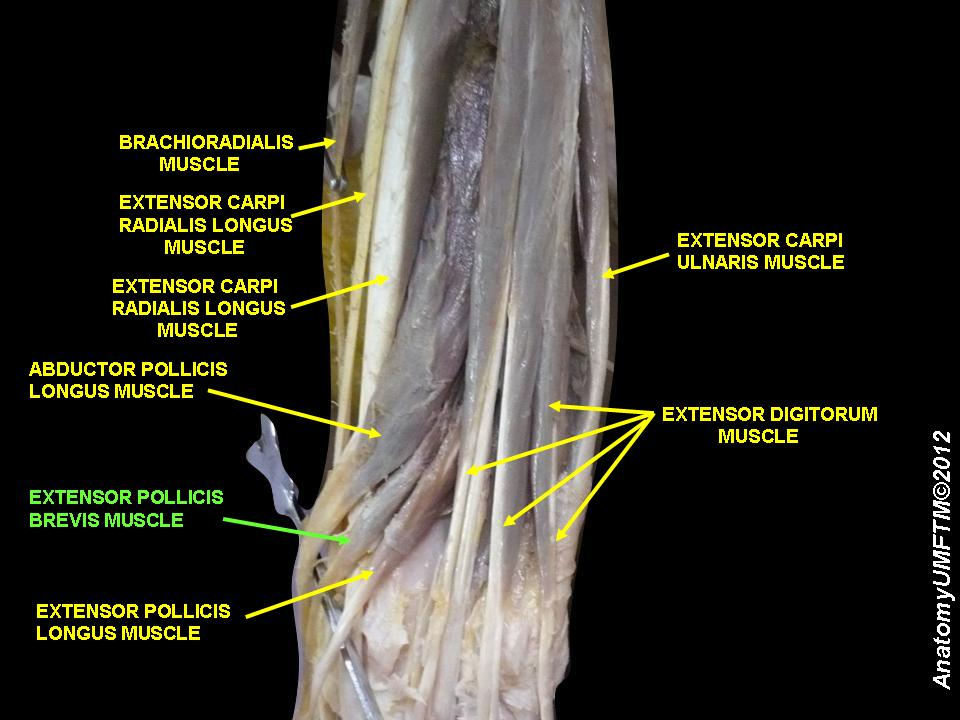
Extensor pollicis brevis muscle

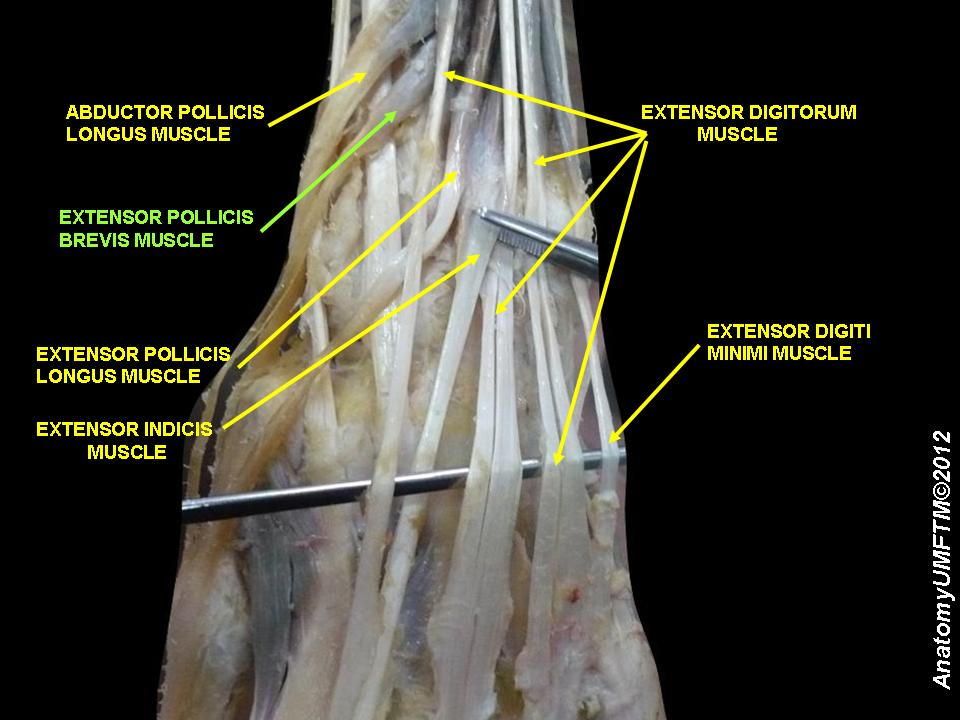
Extensor pollicis brevis muscle

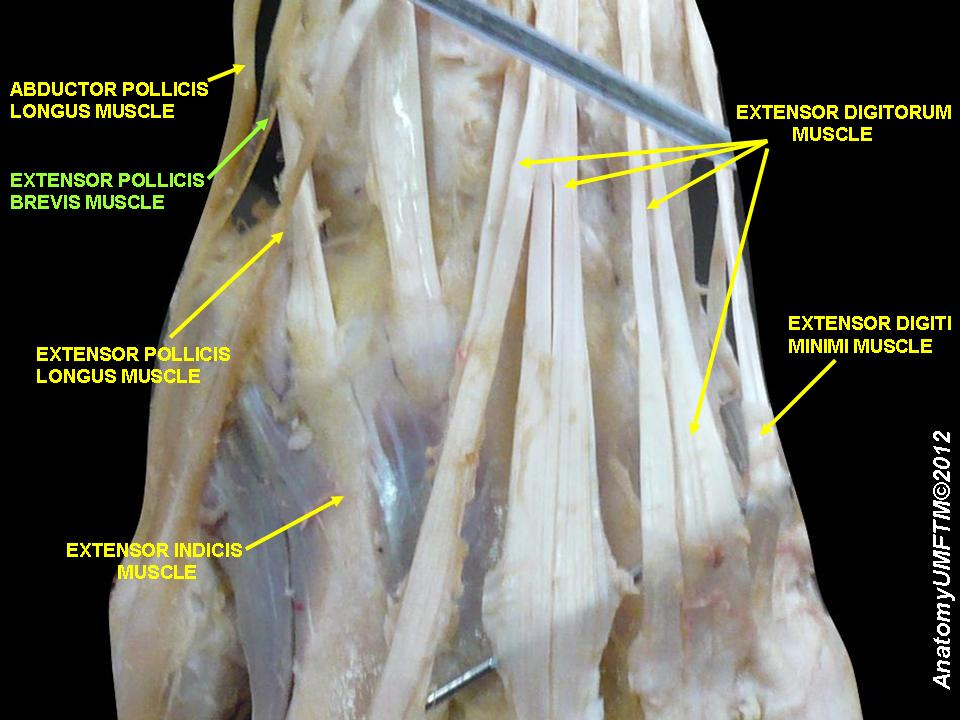
Extensor pollicis brevis muscle

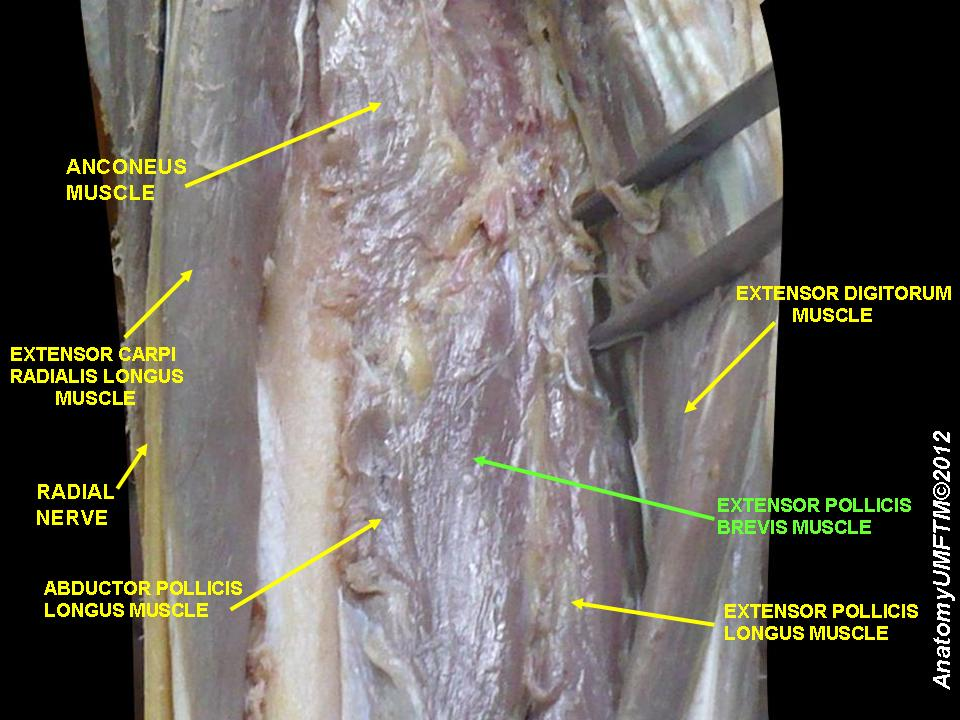
Extensor pollicis brevis muscle

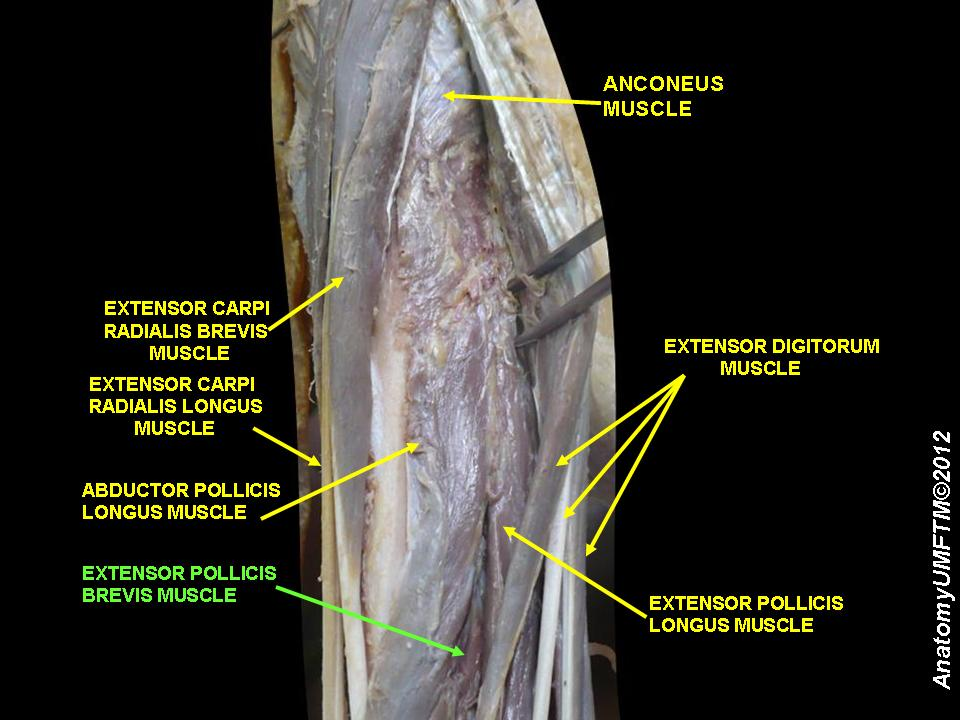
Extensor pollicis brevis muscle

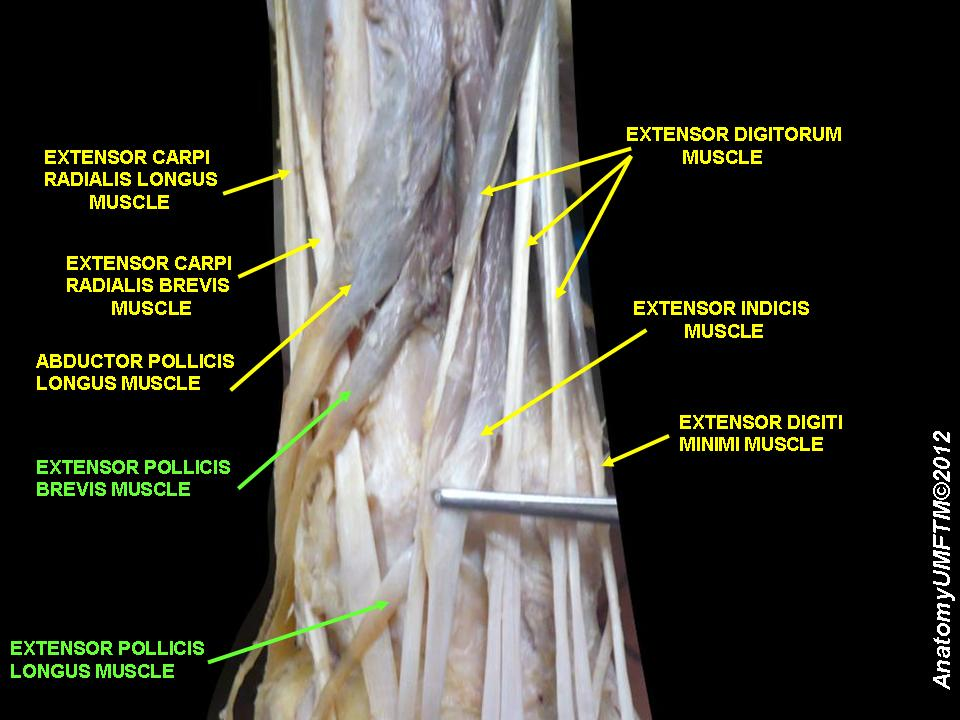
Extensor pollicis brevis muscle

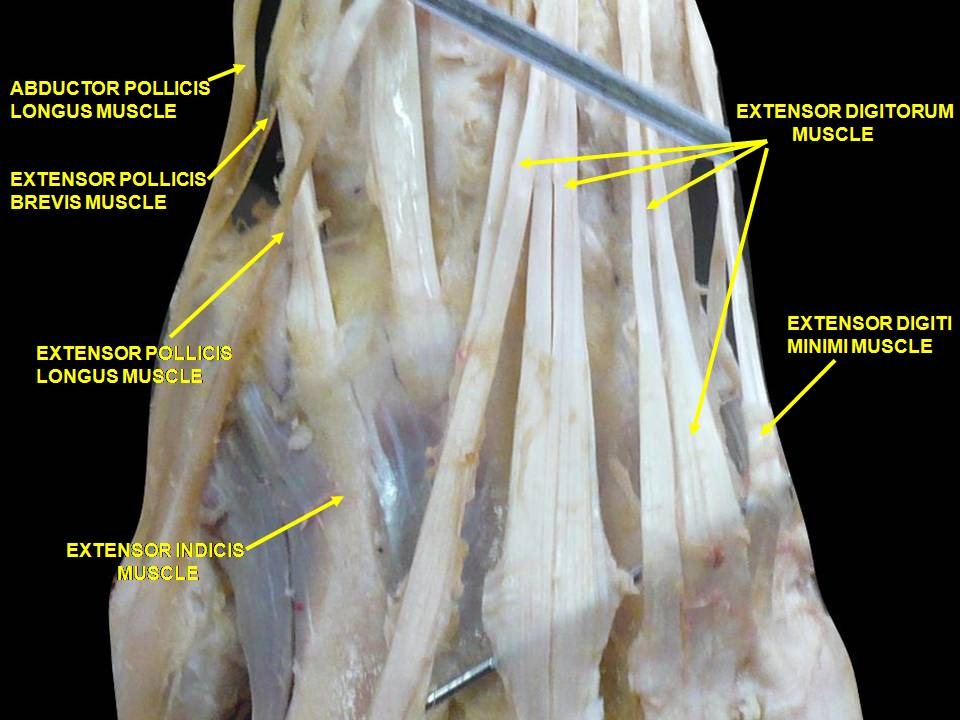
Muscle of the hand. Posterior view.
