= Radial tunnel syndrome =

Compression of the radial nerve in the upper arm

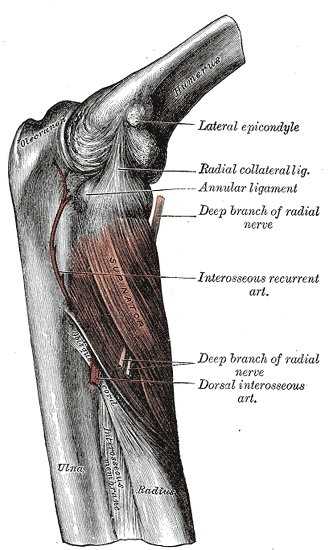
- The supinator. (Deep branch of radial nerve labeled at upper right and lower right. Dorsal interosseous is this nerve after passing the supinator, at lower right.)
- Specialty: Neurology

Radial tunnel syndrome (RTS) is a compression neuropathy of the radial nerve as it travels from the upper arm (the brachial plexus) to the hand and wrist.

== Symptoms and signs ==
Radial tunnel syndrome causes posterolateral elbow pain that is similar to tennis elbow and may sometimes occur in conjunction with that condition. Patients may typically have weakness of extension at the wrist and third digit. The pain is often reproduced upon resisted supination of the forearm, and pain at the radial tunnel on resisted hyperextension of the wrist.

== Cause ==
The theory is that the radial nerve becomes irritated and/or inflamed from friction caused by compression by muscles in the forearm.

Some speculate that radial tunnel syndrome is a type of repetitive strain injury (RSI), but there is no detectable pathophysiology and even the existence of this disorder is questioned.

The term "radial tunnel syndrome" is used for compression of the posterior interosseous nerve, a division of the radial nerve, at the lateral intermuscular septum of arm, while "supinator syndrome" is used for compression at the arcade of Frohse.

The "radial tunnel" is the region from the humeroradial joint past the proximal origin of the supinator muscle. Some scientists believe the radial tunnel extends as far as the distal border of the supinator. The radial nerve is commonly compressed within a 5 cm region near the elbow, but it can be compressed anywhere along the forearm if the syndrome is caused by injury (e.g. a fracture that puts pressure on the radial nerve). The radial nerve provides sensation to the skin of posterior arm, posterior and lateral forearm and wrist, and the joints of the elbow, wrist and hand. The nerve also provides sensory branches that travel to the periosteum of the lateral epicondyle, the anterior radiohumeral joint, and the annular ligament. It provides motor function through innervation to most extensor muscles of the posterior arm and forearm. Therefore, it is extremely important in upper body extremity movement and can cause significant pain to patients presenting with radial tunnel syndrome. Unlike carpal tunnel syndrome, radial tunnel syndrome does not present tingling or numbness, since the posterior interosseous nerve mainly affects motor function.

This problem is often caused by: bone tumors, injury (specifically fractures of the forearm), noncancerous fatty tumors (lipomas), and inflammation of surrounding tissue.

== Diagnosis ==
The diagnosis is based on symptoms and signs alone and objective testing is expected to be normal. This syndrome may be clinically tested by flexing the patients long finger while the patient extends the wrist and fingers. Pain is a positive finding.

The chief complaint of this disease is usually pain in the dorsal aspect of the upper forearm, and any weakness described is secondary to the pain. Tenderness to palpation occurs over the area of the radial neck. Also, the disease can be diagnosed by a positive "middle finger test", where resisted middle finger extension produces pain. Radiographic evaluation of the elbow should be performed to rule out other diagnoses.

== Treatment ==
Non-surgical treatment of radial tunnel syndrome includes rest, NSAID, therapy with modalities, work modification, ergonomic modification, injection if associated with lateral epicondylitis.

Patients whose conditions are more adapted to surgical intervention are those who do not respond to prolonged conservative treatment. The patient must have pain with resisted supination, positive middle finger test, positive electrodiagnostic findings, and pain relief after a nerve block in the radial tunnel. Based on 2002 data, nerve decompression leads to 60–70% good or excellent results.

== See also ==
- Golfer's elbow
- Repetitive strain injury
- Tennis elbow
- Nerve compression syndrome
