= Extensor carpi ulnaris muscle =

Wrist and forearm muscle

Extensor carpi ulnaris
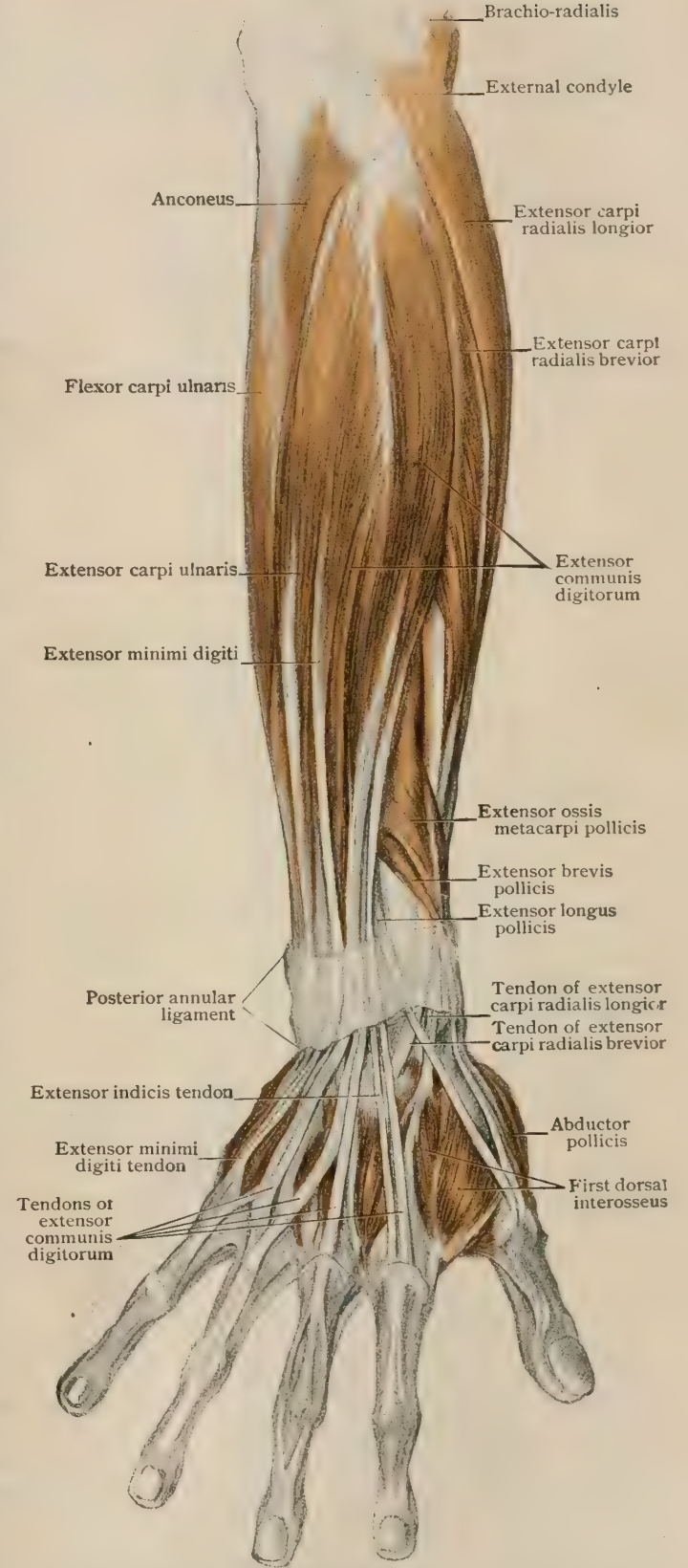
- Dissection of the posterior surface of the right forearm and hand, depicting superficial extensor muscles. (From Piersol's Anatomy.)

Details
- Origin: Humeral head: Lateral epicondyle of the humerus. (???-->)Ulnar head: Olecranon, posterior surface of ulna, antebrachial fascia
- Insertion: 5th metacarpal
- Artery: Ulnar artery
- Nerve: Posterior interosseous nerve
- Actions: Extends and adducts the wrist
- Antagonist: Flexor carpi radialis

Identifiers
- Latin: musculus extensor carpi ulnaris
- TA98: A04.6.02.045
- TA2: 2507
- FMA: 38506

In human anatomy, the extensor carpi ulnaris is a skeletal muscle located on the ulnar side of the forearm. The extensor carpi ulnaris acts to extend and adduct at the carpus/wrist from anatomical position.

Being an extensor muscle, extensor carpi ulnaris is located on the posterior side of the forearm.

== Origin and insertion ==
It originates from the lateral epicondyle of the humerus and the posterior border of the ulna, and crosses the forearm to the ulnar (medial) side to insert at the base of the 5th metacarpal.

== Action ==
The extensor carpi ulnaris extends the wrist, but when acting alone inclines the hand toward the ulnar side; by its continued action it extends the elbow-joint.

The muscle is a minor extensor of the carpus in carnivores, but has become a flexor in ungulates. In this case it would be described as ulnaris lateralis.

== Innervation ==
Despite its name, the extensor carpi ulnaris is innervated by the posterior interosseous nerve (C7 and C8), the continuation of the deep branch of the radial nerve. It would therefore be paralyzed in an injury to the posterior cord of the brachial plexus.

== Injuries ==
A common injury to the extensor carpi ulnaris is tennis elbow. This injury occurs in people who participate in activities requiring repetitive arm, elbow, and wrist, especially when they are tightly gripping an object. Some symptoms of an extensor carpi ulnaris injury include pain when shaking hands or when squeezing/gripping an object. The pain worsens when a person moves their wrist with force. This pain intensifies because the extensor carpi ulnaris has an injury near the elbow area and as a person moves their arm, the muscle contracts, thus causing it to move over the medial epicondyle of the humerus. As a result, this causes irritation to the already existing injury. Some treatments for tennis elbow include occupational therapy, physical therapy, anti-inflammatory medication, and rest from the activity that caused the injury. A similar injury involving the medial elbow is known as golfer's elbow.

=== Treatment and diagnosis ===
An ECU injury most often requires imaging (CT, MRI, ultrasound) for diagnosis. After the ECU injury is diagnosed, a physician will choose a course of treatment, which depends upon the severity of the injury. Conservative treatments include immobilization and stabilization of the affected wrist by placing it in a cast. A long arm cast may be required in order to ensure that all wrist movement has been stopped. The duration of the immobilization is at the treating physician's discretion. After the immobilization period has ended, the cast will be removed and further analysis of the injury will be required. If the injury did not improve with the conservative courses of treatment, or if the injury was initially too severe for conservative treatment, invasive procedures may become necessary. Steroid injections and surgical procedures are the most prominent invasive procedures. Surgical repair or reconstruction of the ECU is not often required, yet a severe ECU injury may cause these approaches to be necessary.

== Additional images ==
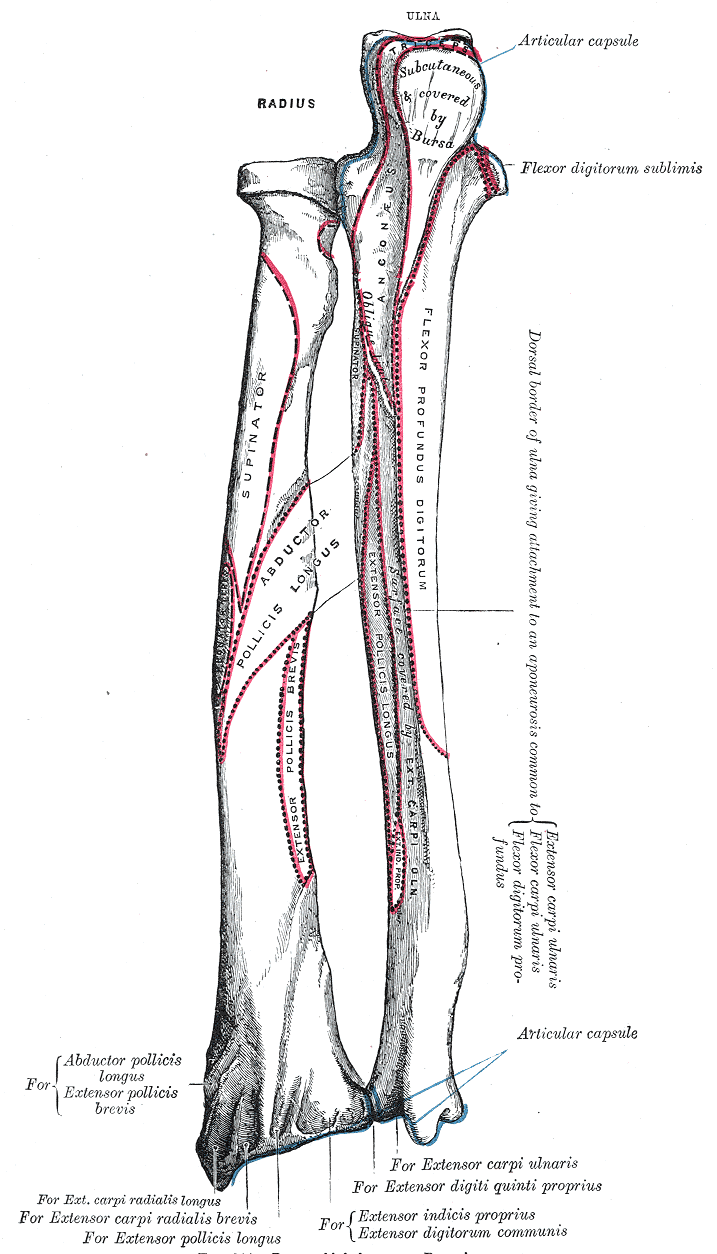
Bones of left forearm. Posterior aspect.

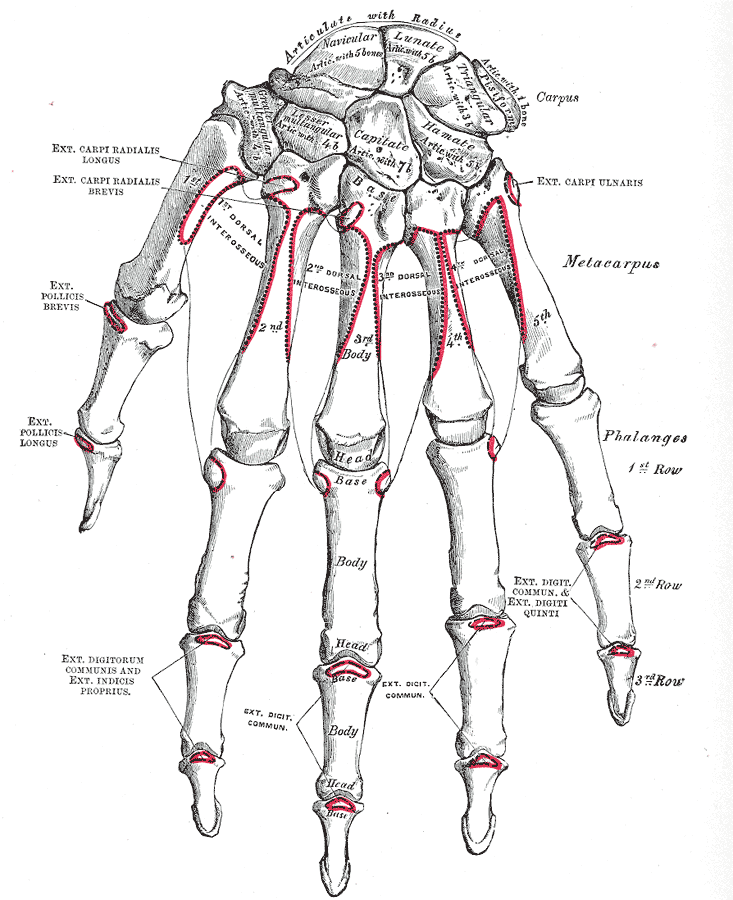
Bones of the left hand. Dorsal surface.

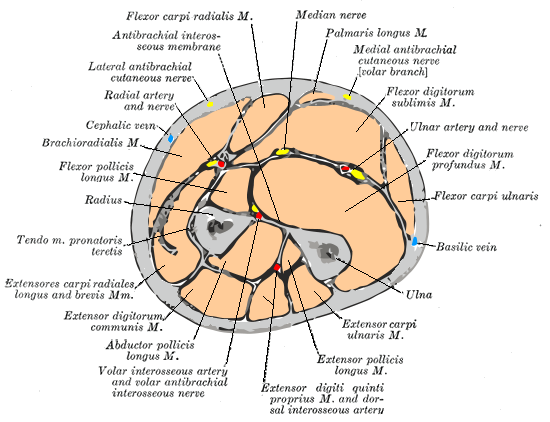
Cross-section through the middle of the right forearm.

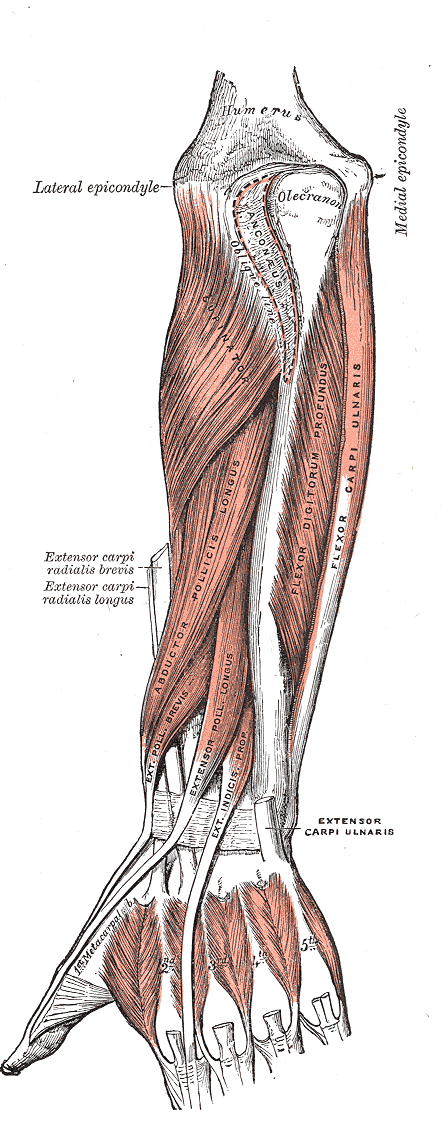
Posterior surface of the forearm. Deep muscles.

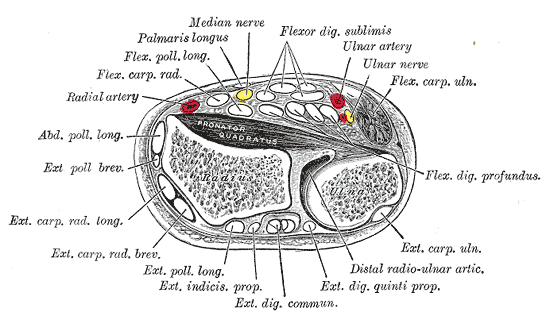
Transverse section across distal ends of radius and ulna.

Transverse section across the wrist and digits.

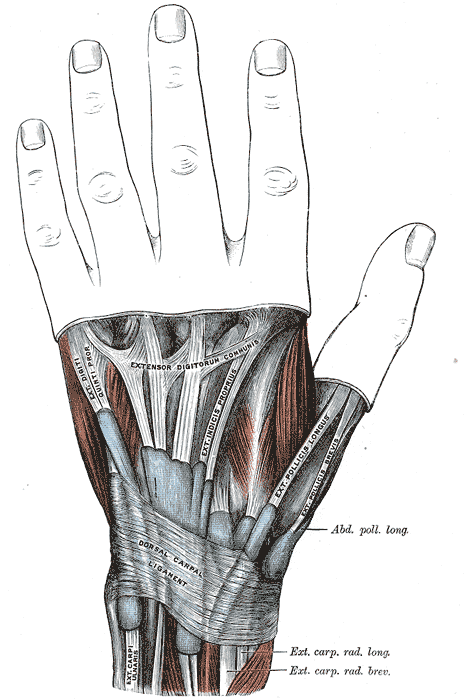
The mucous sheaths of the tendons on the back of the wrist.

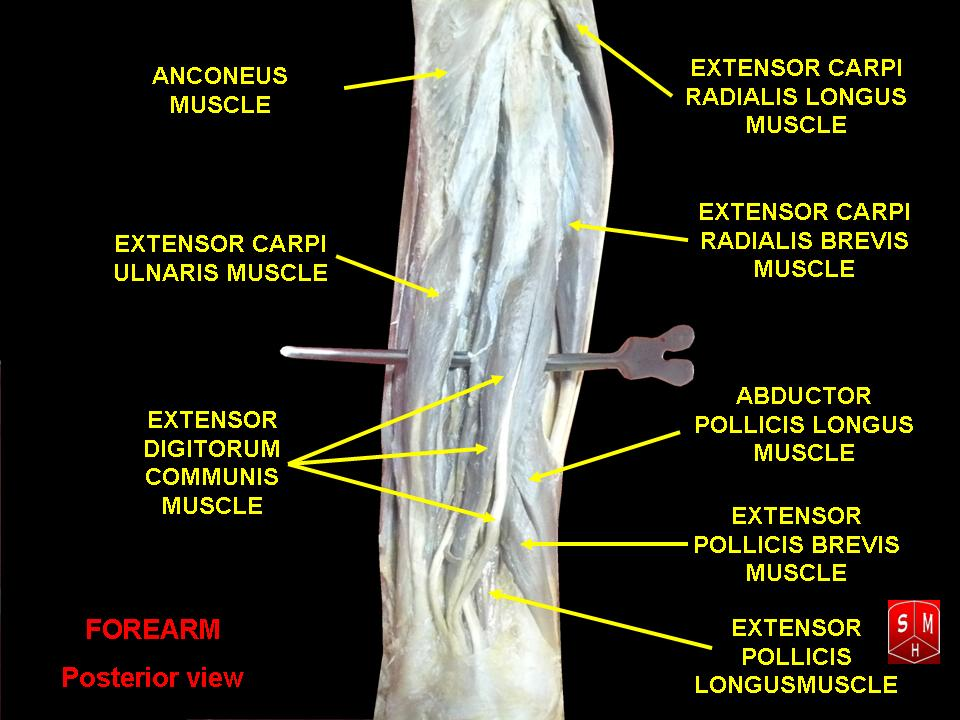
Extensor carpi ulnaris muscle

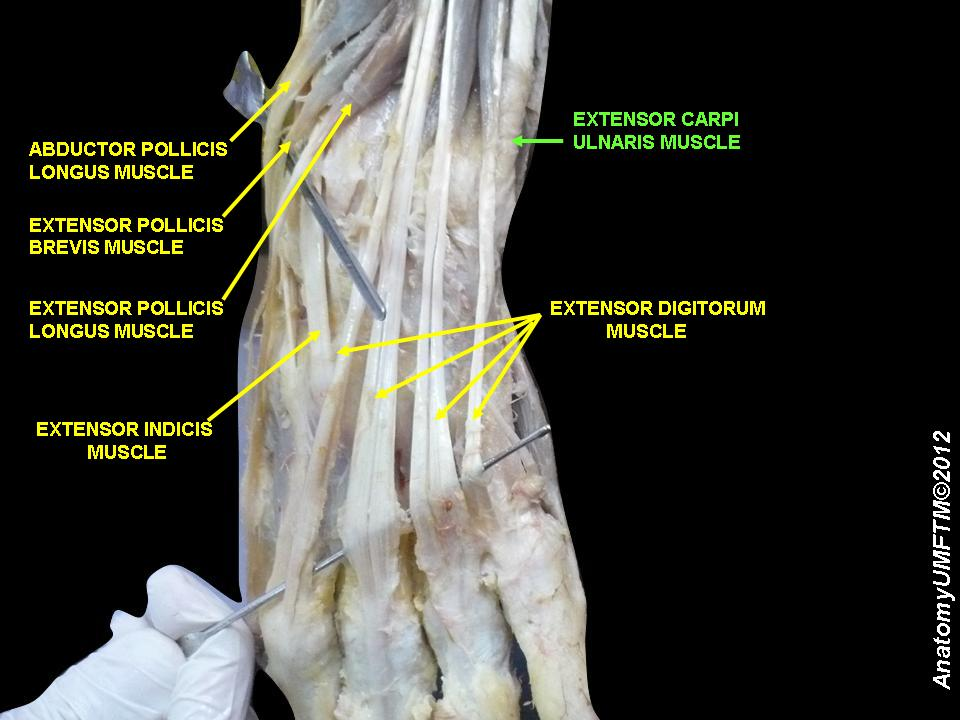
Extensor carpi ulnaris muscle

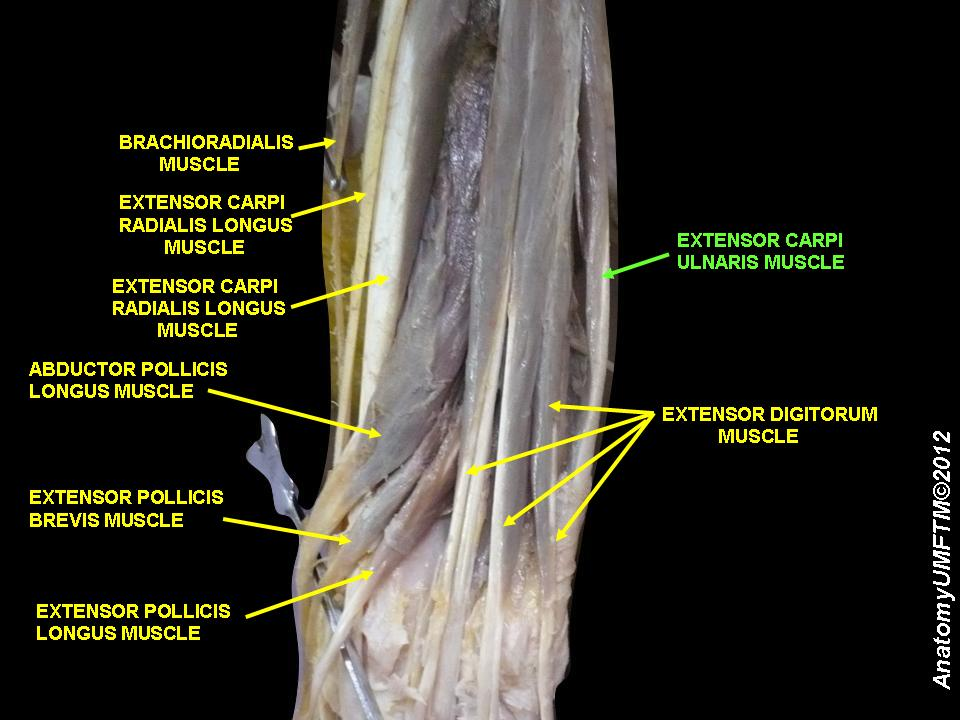
Extensor carpi ulnaris muscle
