= Little League elbow =

- Other names: Medial epicondyle apophysitis
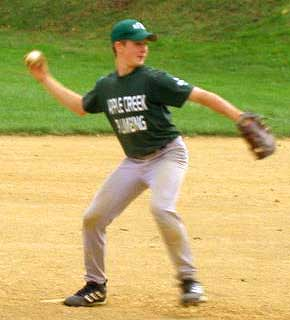
- Pitching
- Causes: Repetitive overhead throwing

Little League elbow, technically known as medial epicondyle apophysitis, is a condition that is caused by repetitive overhand throwing in children.

It most commonly occurs in pitchers under the age of sixteen. The pitching motion causes a valgus stresson the inside of the elbow joint which can result in an avulsion (separation) of the medial epiphyseal plate (growth plate). It does not occur in adults as they lack growth plate. Instead, adult more commonly injury the ulnar collateral ligament of the elbow.

The name was coined by Brogdon and Crow in a 1960 article due to its association with baseball. Compared to athletes who play other sports, baseball players are at higher risk of overuse injuries and injuries caused by early sports specialization by children.

The diagnosis in 1960 raised concerns regarding how much youth players can and should be asked to pitch. In 2007, in order to protect against overuse injuries, Little League Baseball began limiting the number of pitches a player could throw per day.

== Signs and symptoms ==
Little League elbow, or apophysitis of the elbow causes children to feel aching, sharp pain, with or without swelling of the inside of their elbow after pitching. Over time, these symptoms can appear and reappear without warning, even when restricting the athlete to lower velocity pitching. Decreased throwing velocity may also be noted.

== Mechanism ==
Repetitive overhead throws damage the epiphyseal plate at the boney elbow joint. It presents the same whether due to of delayed plate closure, widening, or acute fracture.

== Diagnosis ==
Diagnosis is generally based on physical exam and history, as X-rays are typically normal. Often there is repetitive, high volume, overhand throwing. There may be tenderness, swelling, limited extension, and stiffness of the elbow on exam. X-rays may be helpful to check if the growth plate is open, see if loose bone chips are present, and see if there are signs of early arthritis. X-rays can also rule out other elbow issues, such as fractures of the medial epicondyle from a trauma.

== Prevention ==
In order to prevent Little League elbow, athletes should stay active and fit all year, with at least a 3-6 month break from throwing per year. For pitchers, Little League Pitch Count guidelines should be followed, with warmup and non-pitching throws taken into consideration. Following a pitching outing, athletes should rest their arms for a day or two, and should avoid other high-demand throwing positions on the field (eg. catcher). Another key of prevention is proper throwing form and avoidance of "offspeed pitches" to minimize stress on the elbow.

== Treatment ==
An athlete with Little League elbow must rest, rehab, and then gradually return to throwing. Athletes should stop all overhead throwing activities for 4–6 weeks, and use ice to relieve pain and swelling. NSAIDSs are often unnecessary when resting properly. Rehab consists of focused physical therapy to increase elbow range of motion and build muscle groups for throwing (arm, shoulder, back, and core). Athletes can resume throwing once they have regained full range of motion and strength without pain. Initially throwing should begin at a low volume and low intensity, before progressing through a pitching program to get them back to full speed. Timelines of recovery vary, but athletes usually return to full strength in 8–12 weeks. A lack of treatment can leave patients susceptible to long term issues.

== Outcomes ==
Without timely activity changes, children may get small fractures in the growth plate, loose bodies or bone chips, and they are more susceptible to early arthritis and bone spurs.

== Epidemiology ==
Little League elbow happens to children 8–16 years old who perform repetitive overhand throwing, most often baseball pitchers. The disorder is most common in athletes under age 10 who play year-round and throw excessive amounts. Due to the varying degrees of stress placed on the elbow by different pitches, it is recommended to avoid "offspeed" pitches (curveballs and sliders) until high school age.

== Society and culture ==
The ailment even appeared in the comic strip Peanuts in 1963 when Charlie Brown received a diagnosis.

== See also ==
- Tennis elbow
- Golfer's elbow
- Repetitive strain injury
- Radial tunnel syndrome
- Panner disease
