= Tendinopathy =

Inflammation of the tendon

- Other names: tendinitis, tendinosis
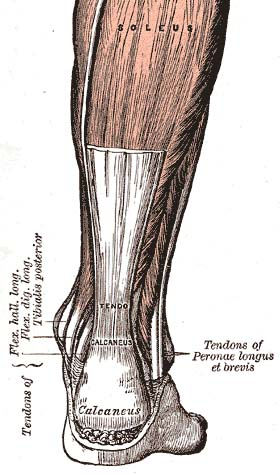
- Achilles tendon (a commonly affected tendon)
- Specialty: Orthopedics
- Symptoms: Pain, swelling
- Causes: Injury from vacation repetitive activities, overuse
- Diagnostic method: Based on symptoms, examination, medical imaging
- Treatment: Rest, NSAIDs, splinting, physiotherapy
- Prognosis: 80% better within 6 months for overuse tendinopathy
- Frequency: Common

Tendinopathy (tendinitis, U.S. English) is a type of tendon disorder that results in pain, swelling, and impaired function. It most commonly occurs around larger joints, including the shoulder (rotator cuff tendinitis, biceps tendinitis), elbow (tennis elbow, golfer's elbow), wrist, hip, knee (jumper's knee), or ankle (Achilles tendinitis).

Causes may include trauma or repetitive activities. Less common causes include infection, arthritis, gout, thyroid disease, diabetes and the use of quinolone antibiotic medicines. Groups at risk include manual laborers, musicians, and sports participants. Diagnosis is typically based on symptoms, examination, and imaging. Typically, little inflammation remains after a few weeks, assuming that the underlying problem is related to weak or disrupted tendon fibrils.

Treatment options include rest, NSAIDs, splinting, and physiotherapy. Steroid injections, surgery, or shockwave therapy may be appropriate. About 80% of overuse tendinopathy patients recover completely within six months. Tendinopathy is relatively common. Older people are most commonly affected.

== Signs and symptoms ==
Symptoms include tenderness on palpation, swelling, and pain, often when exercising or with a specific movement.

== Cause ==
Causes may include trauma or repetitive activities. Less common causes include infection, arthritis, gout, thyroid disease, and diabetes. Obesity, or more specifically, adiposity or fatness, is linked to increasing incidence of tendinopathy.

Quinolone antibiotics are associated with increased risk of tendinitis and tendon rupture. A 2013 review found the incidence of tendon injury among those taking fluoroquinolones to be between 0.08 and 0.2%. Fluoroquinolones most frequently affect large load-bearing tendons in the lower limb, especially the Achilles tendon.

=== Types ===
Examples include:

- Achilles tendinitis
- Calcific tendinitis
- Patellar tendinitis (jumper's knee)

== Pathophysiology ==
As of 2016, the pathophysiology of tendinopathy was poorly understood. While inflammation plays a role, the relationships among changes to the structure of tissue, the function of tendons, and pain are not understood. Several models are proposed, none of which have been fully validated or falsified. Molecular mechanisms involved in inflammation include release of inflammatory cytokines such as IL-1β which reduce the expression of type I collagen mRNA in human tenocytes and cause extracellular matrix degradation in the tendon. A 2020 review noted that while various inflammatory markers were present in two thirds of the reviewed articles, data heterogeneity and lack of comparable studies prevented any conclusion about a common pathophysiology.

Multifactorial theories include tensile overload, tenocyte-related collagen synthesis disruption, load-induced ischemia, neural sprouting, thermal damage, and adaptive compressive responses. The intratendinous sliding motion of fascicles and shear force at interfaces of fascicles could predispose tendons to rupture.

The most commonly accepted cause is an overuse syndrome in combination with factors leading to what may be seen as a progressive interference or the failing of the innate healing response. Tendinopathy involves apoptosis, matrix disorganization and neovascularization.

Classic characteristics include degenerative changes in the collagenous matrix, hypercellularity, hypervascularity, and a lack of inflammatory cells, which has challenged the misnomer "tendinitis".

For chronic tennis elbow, histological findings include granulation tissue, microrupture, degenerative changes, but without traditional inflammation. As a consequence, "lateral elbow tendinopathy or tendinosis" replaces "lateral epicondylitis". Examination of pathologic tennis elbow tissue reveals noninflammatory tissue, elevating the term "angiofibroblastic tendinosis".

Cultures from tendinopathic tendons contain increased type III collagen.

Longitudinal sonogram of the lateral elbow displays thickening and heterogeneity of the common extensor tendon that is consistent with tendinosis, as the ultrasound reveals calcifications, intrasubstance tears, and marked irregularity of the lateral epicondyle. Although the term "epicondylitis" is frequently used to describe this disorder, most histopathologic findings of studies displayed no evidence of an inflammatory process. Histologic studies demonstrated that this condition is the result of tendon degeneration, which causes normal tissue to be replaced by a disorganized collagen arrangement. Therefore, the disorder is more appropriately referred to as "tendinosis" or "tendinopathy" rather than "tendinitis".

Colour Doppler ultrasound reveals structural tendon changes, with vascularity and hypo-echoic areas that correspond to the areas of pain in the extensor origin.

Load-induced non-rupture tendinopathy in humans is associated with an increase in the ratio of collagen III:I proteins, a shift from large to small diameter collagen fibrils, buckling of the collagen fascicles in the tendon extracellular matrix, and buckling of the tenocyte cells and their nuclei.

== Diagnosis ==
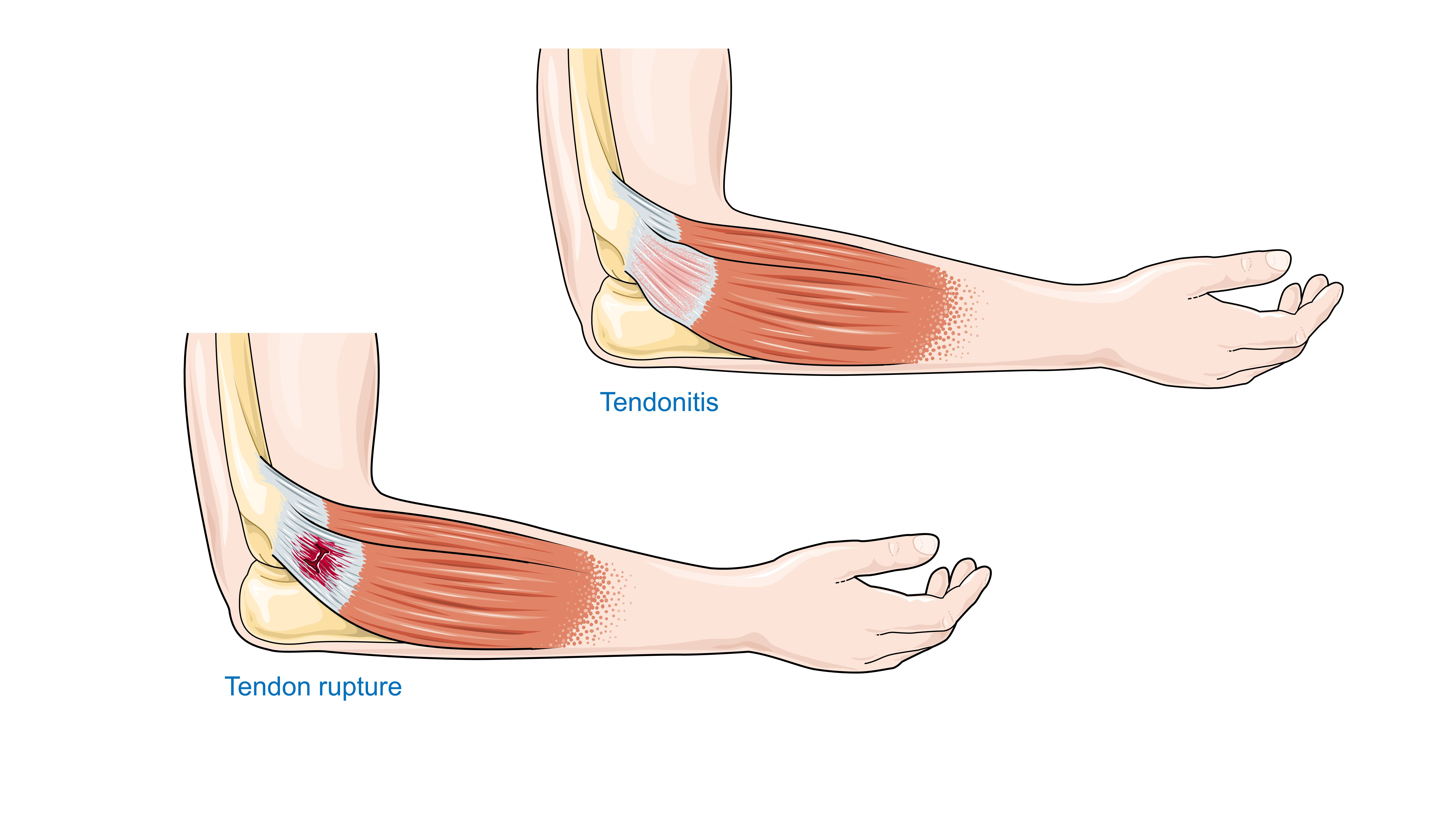
Diagram illustrating tendonitis and tendon rupture

Symptoms can vary from aches or pains and local joint stiffness, to a burning that surrounds the whole joint around the inflamed tendon. In some cases, swelling occurs along with heat and redness, and there may be visible knots surrounding the joint. With this condition, the pain is usually worse during and after activity, and the tendon and joint area can become stiff the following day as muscles tighten from the movement of the tendon. Many patients report stressful situations in their life in correlation with the beginnings of pain which may contribute to the symptoms.

=== Medical imaging ===
Ultrasound imaging can be used to evaluate tissue strain, as well as other mechanical properties. Ultrasound-based techniques are becoming more popular because of its affordability, safety, and speed. Ultrasound can be used for imaging tissues, and the sound waves can also provide information about the mechanical state of the tissue.

== Treatment ==
Treatment of tendon injuries is largely conservative. Use of non-steroidal anti-inflammatory drugs (NSAIDs), rest, and gradual return to exercise is a common therapy. A meta-analysis revealed that exercise using weights or a resistance band is more effective than using bodyweight alone. In addition, having rest days is more effective than exercising every day. Resting assists in the prevention of further damage to the tendon. Ice, compression and elevation are also frequently recommended. Physical therapy, occupational therapy, orthotics or braces may also be useful. Initial recovery is typically within two to three days and full recovery is within three to six months. Tendinosis occurs as the acute phase of healing has ended (six to eight weeks) but has left the area insufficiently healed. Treatment of tendinitis helps reduce some of the risks of developing tendinosis, which takes longer to heal.

There is tentative evidence that low-level laser therapy may also be beneficial in treating tendinopathy. The effects of deep transverse friction massage for treating tennis elbow and lateral knee tendinitis is unclear.

=== Exercise therapy ===
Exercise based rehab is commonly used in the conservative management of tendinopathy. Strengthening exercises targeting the affected tendon, including eccentric, concentric, and isometric contractions, are frequently prescribed in clinical practice. Eccentric loading exercises, which involve muscle contraction while the muscle lengthens, are the most commonly used interventions for conditions such as patellar tendinopathy. A systematic review of randomized controlled trials involving individuals with chronic patellar tendinopathy found low- to very-low-quality evidence regarding the benefits of exercise compared with no treatment, glucocorticoid injections, or surgery. While exercise programs may reduce pain in some cases, studies have generally shown little or no difference in long-term function, pain outcomes, or return-to-sport rates when compared with other interventions.

=== NSAIDs ===
NSAIDs may be used to help with pain. They however do not alter long term outcomes. Other types of pain medication, like paracetamol (acetaminophen), may be just as useful.

=== Steroids ===
Steroid injections have not been shown to have long term benefits for tendonitis, but appear to improve pain and function in the short term more effectively than other treatments except NSAIDs. They appear to have little benefit in tendinitis of the rotator cuff. There are some concerns that they may have negative effects.

=== Other injections ===
There is insufficient evidence on the routine use of injection therapies (autologous blood, platelet-rich plasma, deproteinised haemodialysate, aprotinin, polysulphated glycosaminoglycan, skin derived fibroblasts etc.) for treating Achilles tendinopathy. As of 2014 there was insufficient evidence to support the use of platelet-rich therapies for treating musculoskeletal soft tissue injuries such as ligament, muscle and tendon tears and tendinopathies.

== Prognosis ==
Initial recovery from overuse tendinosis is usually within two to three months, and 80% will recover fully within three to six months.

== Epidemiology ==
Tendon injury and resulting tendinopathy are responsible for up to 30% of consultations to sports doctors and other musculoskeletal health providers. Tendinopathy is most often seen in tendons of athletes either before or after an injury but is becoming more common in non-athletes and sedentary populations. For example, the majority of patients with Achilles tendinopathy in a general population-based study did not associate their condition with a sporting activity. In another study the population incidence of Achilles tendinopathy increased sixfold from 1979–1986 to 1987–1994. The incidence of rotator cuff tendinopathy ranges from 0.3% to 5.5% and annual prevalence from 0.5% to 7.4%.

== Terminology ==
Tendinitis is a very common, but misleading term. By definition, the suffix "-itis" means "inflammation of". Inflammation is the body's local response to tissue damage which involves red blood cells, white blood cells, blood proteins with dilation of blood vessels around the site of injury. Tendons are relatively avascular. Corticosteroids are drugs that reduce inflammation. Corticosteroids can be useful to relieve chronic tendinopathy pain, improve function, and reduce swelling in the short term. However, there is a greater risk of long-term recurrence. They are typically injected along with a small amount of a numbing drug called lidocaine. Research shows that tendons are weaker following corticosteroid injections.

Tendinitis is still a very common diagnosis, though research increasingly documents that what is thought to be tendinitis is usually tendinosis.

Anatomically close but separate conditions are:

- Enthesitis, wherein there is inflammation of the entheses, the sites where tendons or ligaments insert into the bone. It is associated with HLA B27 arthropathies such as ankylosing spondylitis, psoriatic arthritis, and reactive arthritis.
- Apophysitis, inflammation of the bony attachment, generally associated with overuse among growing children.

== Research ==
The use of a nitric oxide delivery system (glyceryl trinitrate patches) applied over the area of maximal tenderness was found to reduce pain and increase range of motion and strength.

A promising therapy involves eccentric loading exercises involving lengthening muscular contractions.

== Other animals ==
Bowed tendon is a term for form of tendinitis (inflammation) and tendinosis (degeneration) most commonly seen in the superficial digital flexor tendon in the front leg of horses.

Mesenchymal stem cells, derived from a horse's bone marrow or fat, can be used for tendon repair in horses.
