= Lateral epicondyle of the humerus =

Structure of humerus

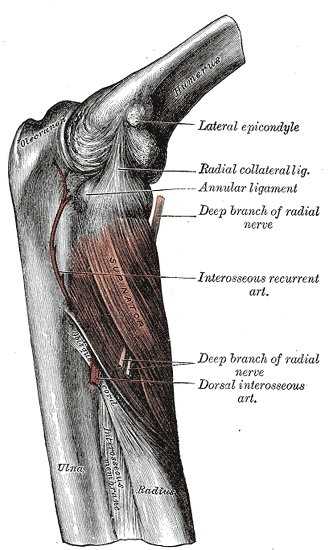
- The supinator. (Lateral epicondyle labeled at upper right.)

- Left elbow-joint, showing posterior and radial collateral ligaments. (Lateral epicondyle visible at center.)

Details

Identifiers
- Latin: epicondylus lateralis humeri
- TA98: A02.4.04.029
- TA2: 1209
- FMA: 23442

The lateral epicondyle of the humerus is a large epicondyle, a tuberculated eminence, curved a little forward, and giving attachment to the radial collateral ligament of the elbow joint, and to a tendon common to the origin of the supinator and some of the extensor muscles. Specifically, these extensor muscles include the anconeus muscle, the supinator, extensor carpi radialis brevis, extensor digitorum, extensor digiti minimi, and extensor carpi ulnaris. In birds, where the arm is somewhat rotated compared to other tetrapods, it is termed the dorsal epicondyle of the humerus. In comparative anatomy, the term ectepicondyle is sometimes used.

A common injury associated with the lateral epicondyle of the humerus is lateral epicondylitis also known as tennis elbow. Repetitive overuse of the forearm, as seen in tennis or other sports, can result in inflammation of "the tendons that join the forearm muscles on the outside of the elbow. The forearm muscles and tendons become damaged from overuse. This leads to pain and tenderness on the outside of the elbow."

== See also ==
- Medial epicondyle of the humerus
- Common extensor tendon

== Additional images ==
Right lateral epicondyle colored in red

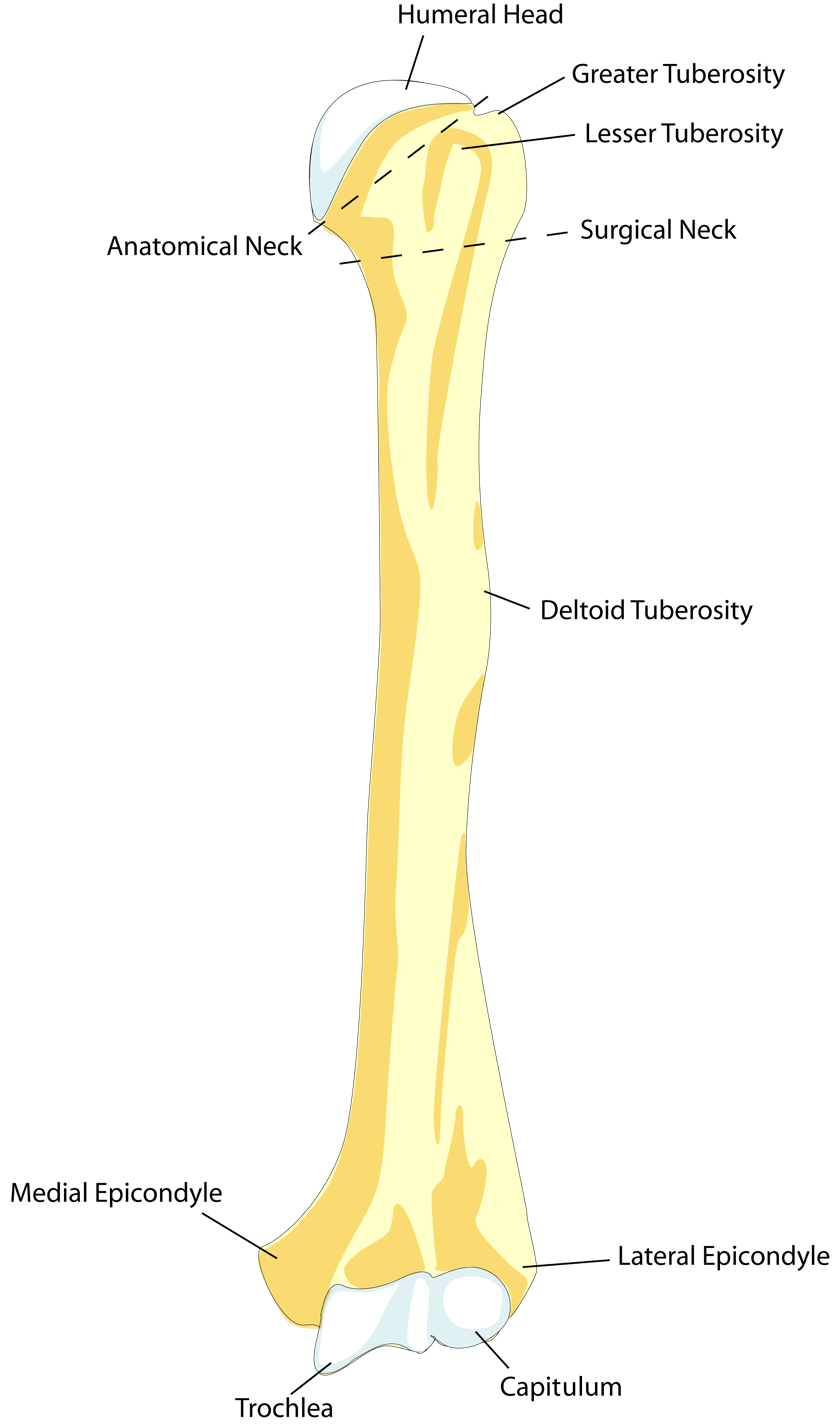
Left humerus. Anterior view.

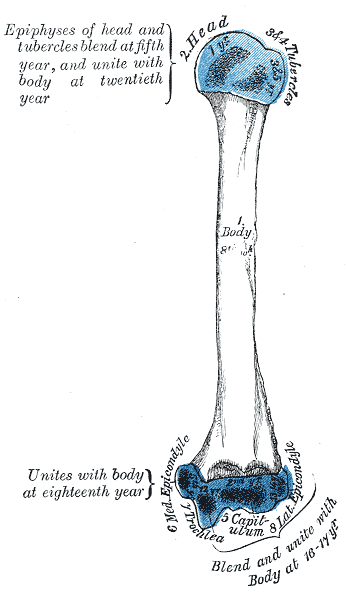
Plan of ossification of the humerus.

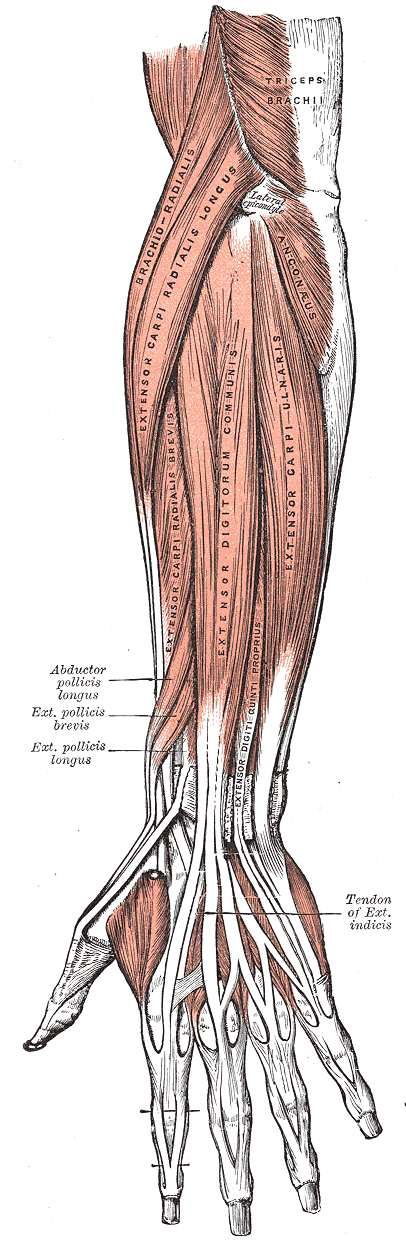
Posterior surface of the forearm. Superficial muscles.

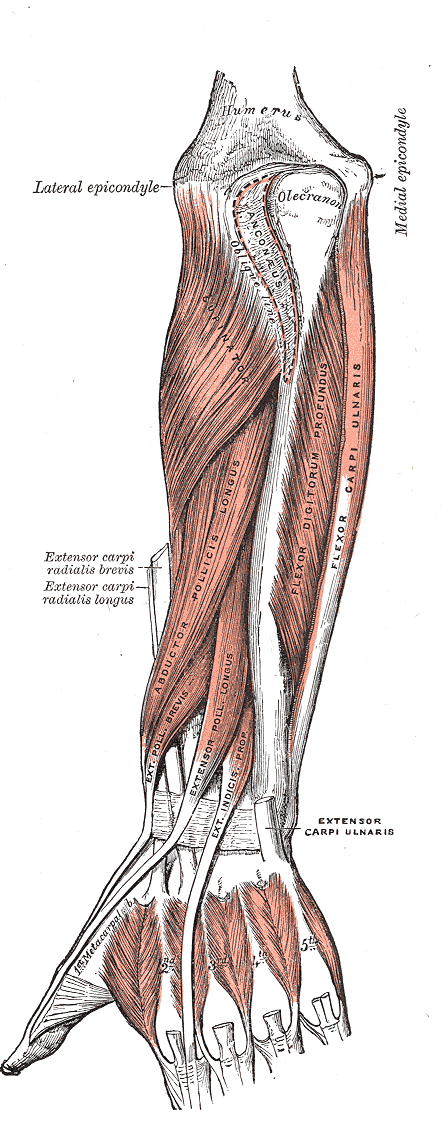
Posterior surface of the forearm. Deep muscles.
