= Golfer's elbow =

Tendon inflammation disease of the elbow

- Other names: Medial epicondylitis
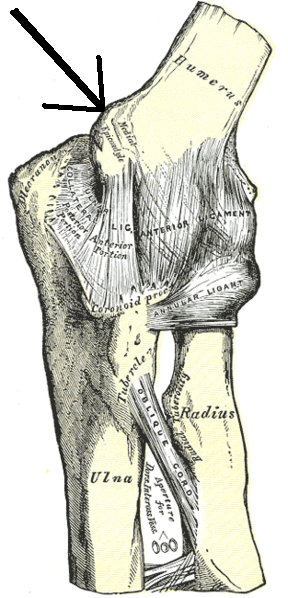
- Left elbow-joint from above, showing anterior and ulnar collateral ligaments. (Medial epicondyle labeled at center top.)
- Specialty: Orthopedics

Golfer's elbow (or medial epicondylitis) is tendinosis (or more precisely enthesopathy) of the medial common flexor tendon and pronator teres muscle attachment on the inside of the elbow. It is similar in etiology to the overuse occurring in tennis elbow, which affects the outside of the elbow at the lateral epicondyle, and other enthesopathies of musculoskeletal attachment tissues.

Given the limited evidence regarding its etiology, golfer's elbow enthesopathy results from overload by repetitive use of the arm, causing an injury similar to ulnar collateral ligament injury of the elbow in "pitcher's elbow", which manifests as Little League elbow in children.

== Description ==
The anterior-medial forearm contains several muscles that flex the wrist and pronate the forearm. These muscles have a common tendinous attachment at the medial epicondyle of the humerus at the elbow joint.

The flexor and pronator muscles of the forearm include the pronator teres, flexor carpi radialis, palmaris longus, and flexor digitorum superficialis, all of which originate on the medial epicondyle and are innervated by the median nerve. The flexor carpi ulnaris muscle also inserts on the medial epicondyle and is innervated by the ulnar nerve. Together, these five muscles have a common attachment (an enthesis) on the medial epicondyle of the humerus. The flexor tendon is approximately 3 centimetres (1.2 in) long, crosses the medial aspect of the elbow, and runs parallel to the ulnar collateral ligament.

The injury is not acute inflammation, but rather is a chronic disorder resulting from overuse of a repetitive arm motion. Repetitive activity leads to recurrent microtears within the tendon attachments of forearm muscles to the elbow. As a result, scar tissue formation and thickening of the tendon lead to reduced collagen strength and pain with repetitive use.

== Causes ==
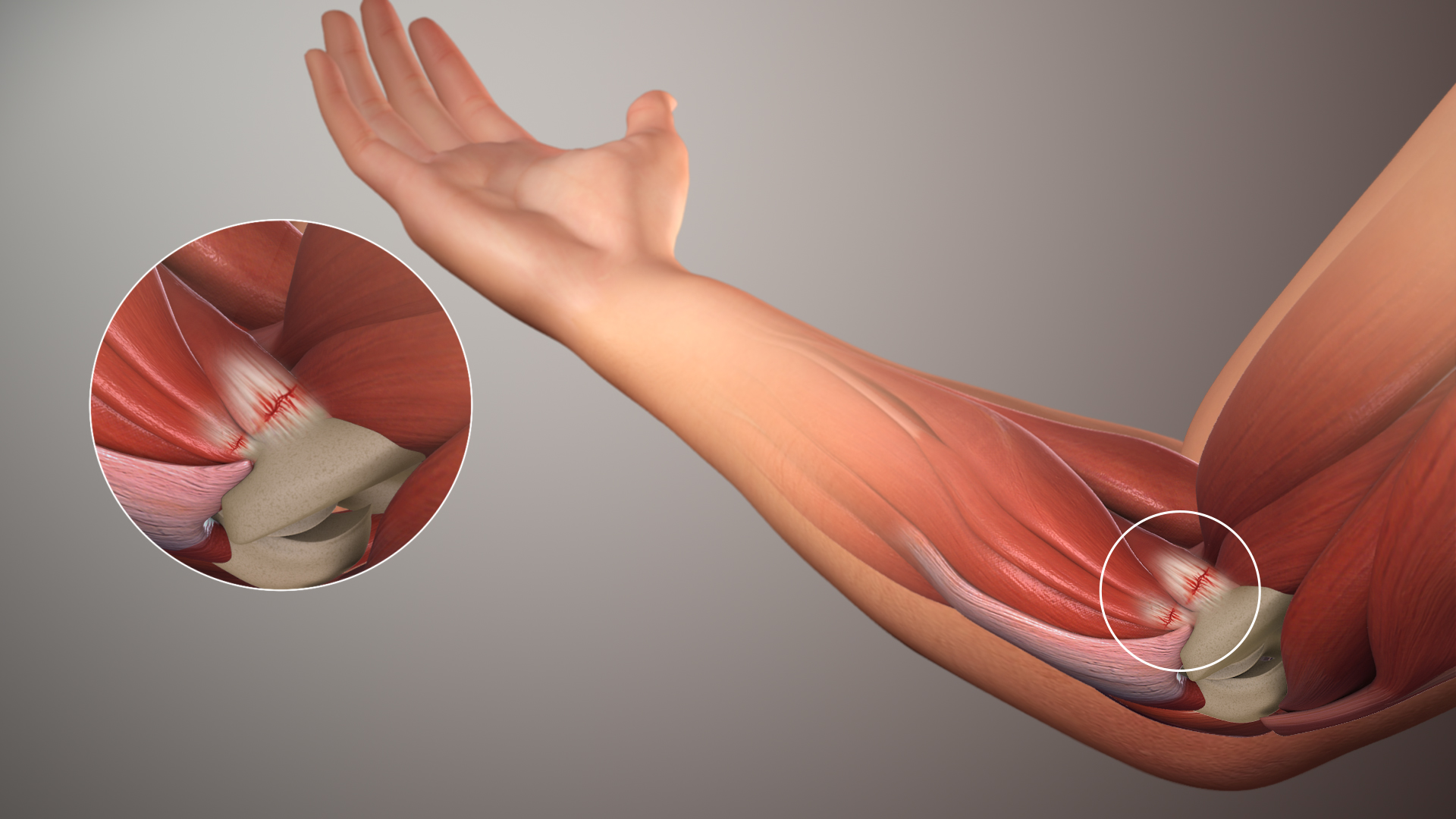
Still shot from a 3D medical animation illustrating golfer's elbow affecting the medial epicondyle on the lower inside of the joint.

The condition is referred to as golfer's elbow when a full golf swing causes elbow pain. It may also be called pitcher's elbow or Little League elbow due to the same tendon being stressed by repetitive throwing of objects, such as a baseball or football.

Golfer's elbow appears to occur from repetitive full swings during the period from the top of the backswing to just before ball impact. The full swing motion causes high energy valgus forces during the late cocking (backswing in golf) and acceleration phase (downswing and impact).

It is unknown whether this condition is any more common in labor-related occupations with forceful repetitive activities (such as in construction or plumbing) than it is in the general public.

== Diagnosis ==
Medial epicondylitis is diagnosed based on characteristic pain with activities using strength in wrist flexion and confirmed on examination with discrete point tenderness over the common flexor origin at the medial epicondyle, and pain with resisted wrist flexion and passive wrist extension.

Imaging may be employed, although radiography might show calcifications in the muscle origin. Ultrasound and magnetic resonance imaging can identify the mucoid degeneration, but are not necessary for diagnosis.

== Occurrence ==
The condition is prevalent in athletes, particularly golfers, baseball pitchers, tennis players, javelin throwers, bowlers, and weightlifters.

Medial injury of the flexor tendon is estimated to occur in 0.4% of the population, most often in people over age 40, is more common in women than in men, and with 75% of cases in the dominant arm.

=== Risk factors ===
Risk factors for developing golfer's elbow include improper technique or lack of strength, endurance, or flexibility in a dominant arm. Risk factors in people performing manual labor include heavy and excessive repetition, high body mass index, the presence of comorbidities, and high work demands. Smoking and diabetes increase risk.

People with the disorder receiving prescribed treatments recover from elbow pain during use within a year or two.

== Treatment ==
Non-specific treatments include:

- Rest
- Non-steroidal anti-inflammatory drugs (NSAIDs): ibuprofen, naproxen or aspirin
- Heat or ice
- A counterforce brace or "elbow strap" to reduce strain at the elbow epicondyle, to limit pain provocation and to protect against further damage.

Before anesthetics and steroids are used, conservative treatment with an occupational therapist may be attempted. Before therapy can commence, treatment such as rest, ice, compression and elevation (R.I.C.E.) will typically be used. This will help to decrease the pain and inflammation; rest will alleviate discomfort because golfer's elbow is an overuse injury. A brace can be placed anteromedially on the proximal forearm. The splint is made in 30–45 degrees of elbow flexion. A daytime elbow pad also may be useful, by limiting additional trauma to the nerve.

Simple analgesic medication has a place, as does more specific treatment with oral anti-inflammatory medications. A more invasive treatment is the injection into and around the inflamed and tender area of a glucocorticoid (steroid) agent.

=== Physical therapy ===
Therapy includes a variety of exercises for muscle and tendon reconditioning, starting with stretching and gradual strengthening of the flexor-pronator muscles. Strengthening will slowly begin with isometrics and progresses to eccentric exercises helping to re-establish the range of motion. After the strengthening exercises, it is common for the subject to ice the area.

=== Surgery ===
After 6 months if the symptoms do not improve, surgery may be recommended. Surgical debridement or cleaning of the area is one of the most common treatments. The ulnar nerve may also be decompressed surgically. If the appropriate remediation steps are taken – rest, ice, and rehabilitative exercise and stretching – recovery may follow. Few subjects will need to progress to steroid injection, and less than 10% will require surgical intervention. Arthroscopy is not an option for treating golfer's elbow.

== See also ==
- Radial tunnel syndrome
- Repetitive strain injury
- Tennis elbow
