= Tennis elbow =

Condition in which the outer part of the elbow becomes sore and tender

- Other names: Lateral epicondylitis, lateral elbow tendinopathy, pickleball elbow
- Left elbow-joint. (Lateral epicondyle visible at center.)
- Specialty: Orthopedics, sports medicine
- Symptoms: Painful and tender outer part of the elbow
- Usual onset: Gradual
- Duration: Less than 1 to 2 years
- Causes: Middle age (ages 35–60).
- Diagnostic method: Symptoms and physical examination
- Differential diagnosis: Osteoarthritis
- Treatment: Nothing is proved to alter the natural course of the disease. Exercises, braces, ice or heat, and medications may be palliative.

Tennis elbow, also known as lateral epicondylitis, is an enthesopathy (attachment point disease) of the origin of the extensor carpi radialis brevis on the lateral epicondyle. It causes pain and tenderness over the lateral epicondyle.

Tennis elbow is idiopathic, meaning its precise cause is unknown. It likely involves tendinosis, an overuse injury of the local tendon.

It is typically associated with work or sports – classically racquet sports (including paddle sports) – but many people with the condition are not participants in these activities. The diagnosis is based on the symptoms and examination. Medical imaging is not commonly used.

Untreated enthesopathy usually resolves in 1–2 years. Treating the symptoms and pain involves medications such as NSAIDs or acetaminophen, a wrist brace, or a strap over the upper forearm. Corticosteroid injections as treatment are not common.

== Signs and symptoms ==
Patients typically feel pain or burning around the outer part of the elbow (lateral epicondyle of the humerus), which can move down the forearm and sometimes up to the upper arm. The pain is worsened by activities that involve wrist extension, such as gripping objects. Pain intensity varies from mild to severe and can be intermittent or constant, significantly impacting daily life. Patients also commonly report grip weakness and difficulty lifting.

=== Terminology ===
The term "tennis elbow" is widely used (although informal), but the condition affects non-tennis players. In the 21st century, the growth of pickleball participation led to the term, pickleball elbow. Historically, the medical term "lateral epicondylitis" was most commonly used for the condition, but "itis" implies inflammation, and the condition is not typically an inflammation. It is also referred to as enthesopathy of the extensor carpi radialis origin.

Because histological findings reveal noninflammatory tissue, the terms "lateral elbow tendinopathy" and "tendinosis" are used clinically.

In 2019, a group of international experts suggested that "lateral elbow tendinopathy" was the most appropriate terminology, although an injury at an attachment point (or enthesia) is typically called an enthesopathy.

== Causes ==
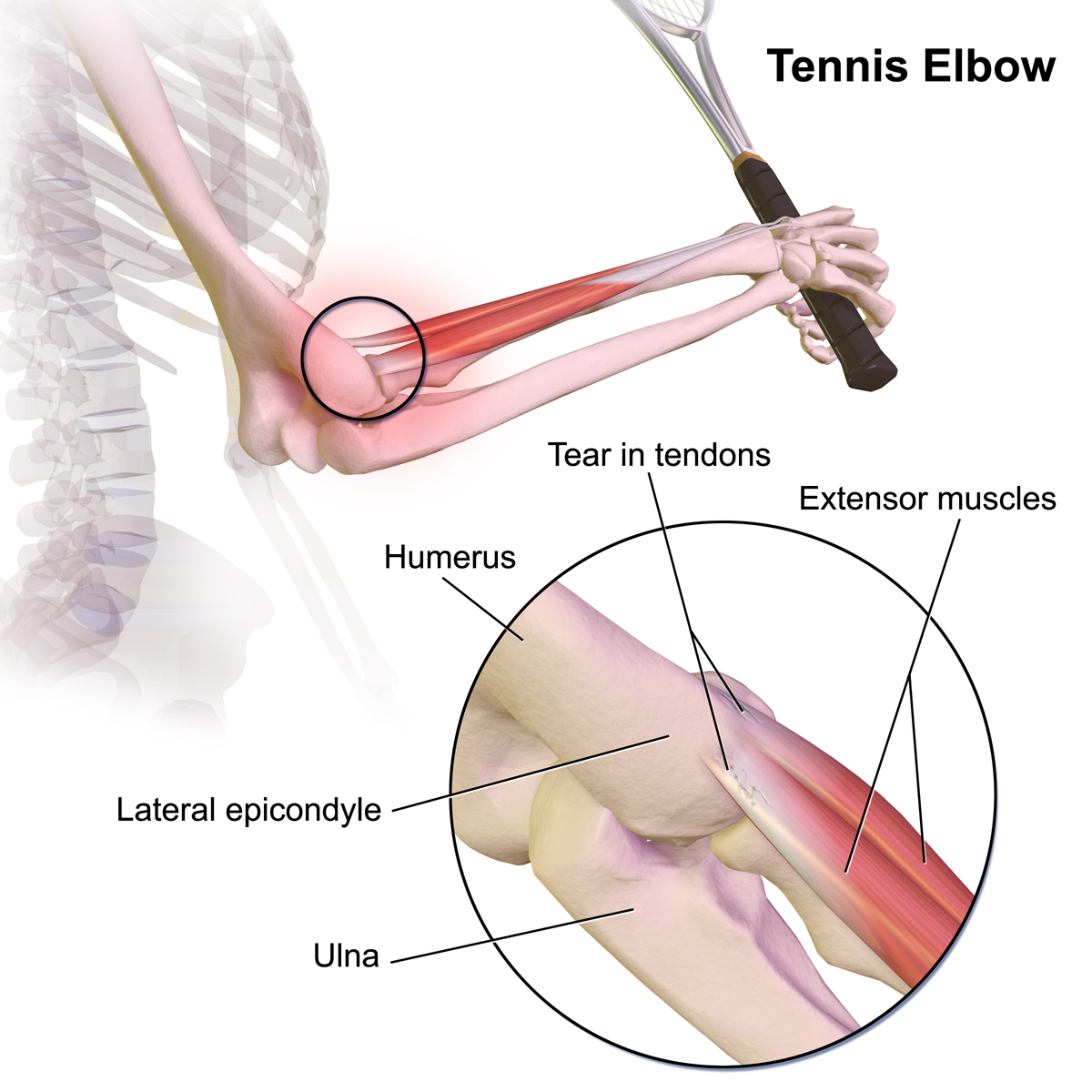
Location of tennis elbow

The exact cause of lateral epicondylitis remains unclear. However, it is often linked to repetitive microtrauma resulting from excessive gripping, wrist extension, radial deviation, and/or forearm supination.

Traditionally, people have speculated that tennis elbow is a type of repetitive strain injury resulting from tendon overuse and failed healing of the tendon, but there is no evidence of injury or repair, and misinterpretation of painful activities as a source of damage is common.

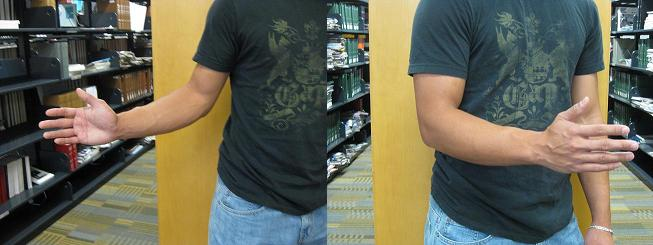
Example of repetitive movement that may cause tennis elbow

== Pathophysiology ==
The extensor carpi radialis brevis (ECRB) is the most commonly affected muscle in lateral epicondylitis, along with other extensor carpal muscles. Due to its unique origin, the ECRB tendon is prone to abrasion during elbow movements, leading to repetitive microtrauma, and interpretation that tennis elbow is a mechanical overuse injury.

Lateral epicondylitis was initially considered an inflammatory process, although there is no clear evidence of inflammation. Therefore, the disorder is more appropriately referred to as tendinosis or tendinopathy. Tendinosis is a degenerative condition involving fibroblasts, abnormal collagen, and increased blood vessels. Repetitive stress causes microtears, scar tissue formation, and biomechanical changes, with worsening symptoms over time.

== Clinical evaluation ==
=== Physical examination ===
Diagnosis is based on symptoms and clinical signs that are discrete and characteristic. For example, the extension of the elbow and flexion of the wrist causes outer elbow pain. The physical examination usually reveals marked tenderness at the origin of the extensor carpi radialis brevis muscle from the lateral epicondyle (extensor carpi radialis brevis origin). Pain may worsen with resisted wrist extension, middle finger extension, and forearm supination with an extended elbow, although normal elbow movement is often maintained, even in severe cases.

=== Medical imaging ===
Medical imaging is not necessary or helpful.

Radiographs (X-rays) may demonstrate calcification where the extensor muscles attach to the lateral epicondyle.

Longitudinal sonogram of the lateral elbow displays thickening and heterogeneity of the common extensor tendon that is consistent with tendinosis, as the ultrasound reveals calcifications, intrasubstance tears, and marked irregularity of the lateral epicondyle. Although the term "epicondylitis" is frequently used to describe this disorder, most histopathologic findings of studies have displayed no evidence of an acute, or a chronic inflammatory process. Histologic studies have demonstrated that this condition is the result of tendon degeneration, which replaces normal tissue with a disorganized arrangement of collagen. Colour Doppler ultrasound reveals structural tendon changes, with vascularity and hypo-echoic areas that correspond to the areas of pain in the extensor origin.

Table of Clinical classification of lateral epicondylitis phases.

Phase	Description of pain changes at different phases
I	Mild pain after activity, usually recovers within 24 hours
II	Mild pain more than 48 hours after activity, no pain during activity, can be relieved with warm-up exercises, and recovers within 72 hours
III	Mild pain before and during activity, no significant negative impact on the activities, and can be partially relieved with warm-up exercises
IV	Mild pain accompanies the activities of daily living and has negative impact on the performance of activities
V	Harmful pain unrelated to activities, great negative impact on the performance of activities but does not prevent the activities of daily life. Need complete rest to control the pain
VI	Persistent pain despite complete rest and can prevent the activities of daily life
VII	Consistent pain at rest, aggravated after activities, and disturbed sleep

=== Prevention ===
Activity modification is the best way to prevent the occurrence of lateral epicondylitis. Prevention can include avoiding extreme end range motions in extension and flexion, limit repetitive hand and wrist motions, and modification of heavy lifting with extended arms. Lifestyle factors such as smoking, alcohol drinking, and dietary habits are known to influence the prognosis of various medical conditions. Smokers showed a higher chance of developing lateral epicondylitis compared to non-smokers. Current research indicates that alcohol intake is not significantly associated with lateral epicondylitis.

== Treatment ==
=== Non-operative treatment ===
There is no standard method for treating tennis elbow. Non-operative treatment resolves 90% of symptomatic lateral epicondylitis. Nonoperative care usually includes activity modification, physical therapy, non-steroidal anti-inflammatory medications, bracing, extracorporeal shock-wave therapy, and acupuncture. Modifying activity and avoiding overuse are key to treatment. Lifting with the palm up and avoiding palm-down movements can shift strain from the lateral to the medial epicondyle, easing pain. Following the RICE method (rest, ice, compression, elevation) can help relieve pain initially.

=== Exercises ===
Stretching and isometric strengthening are the most common recommended exercises. The muscle is stretched with the elbow straight and the wrist passively flexed. Isometric strengthening can be done by pushing the top of the hand up against the undersurface of a table and holding the wrist straight.

=== Orthotic devices ===
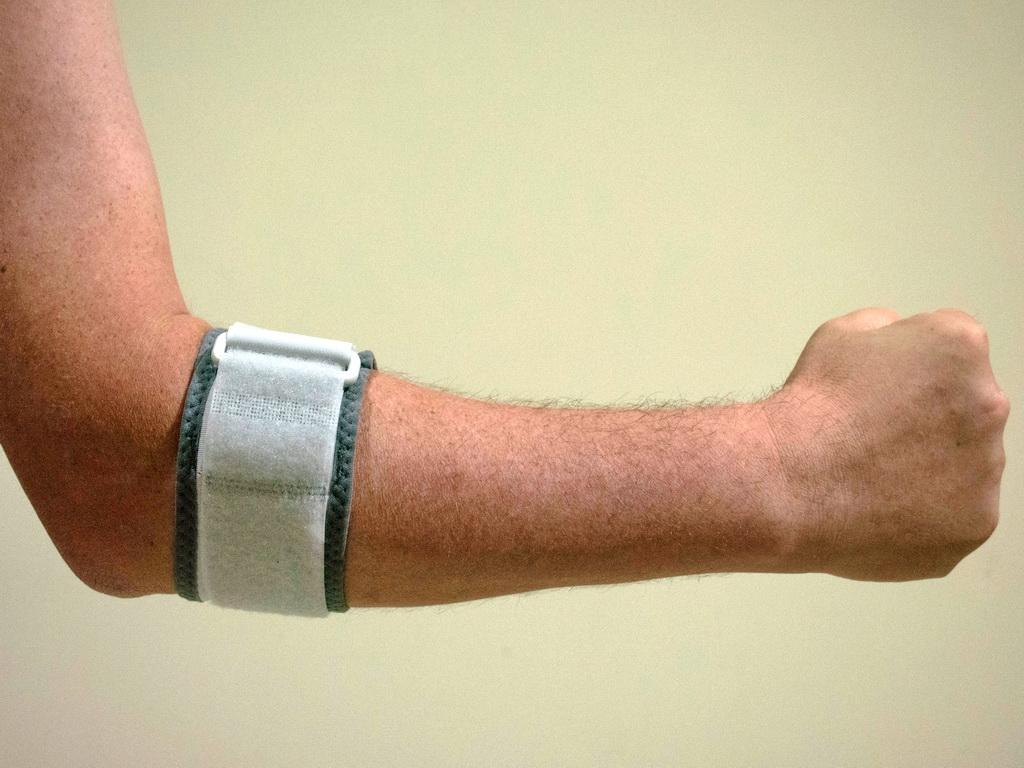
Counterforce orthosis reduces the elongation within the musculotendinous fibers

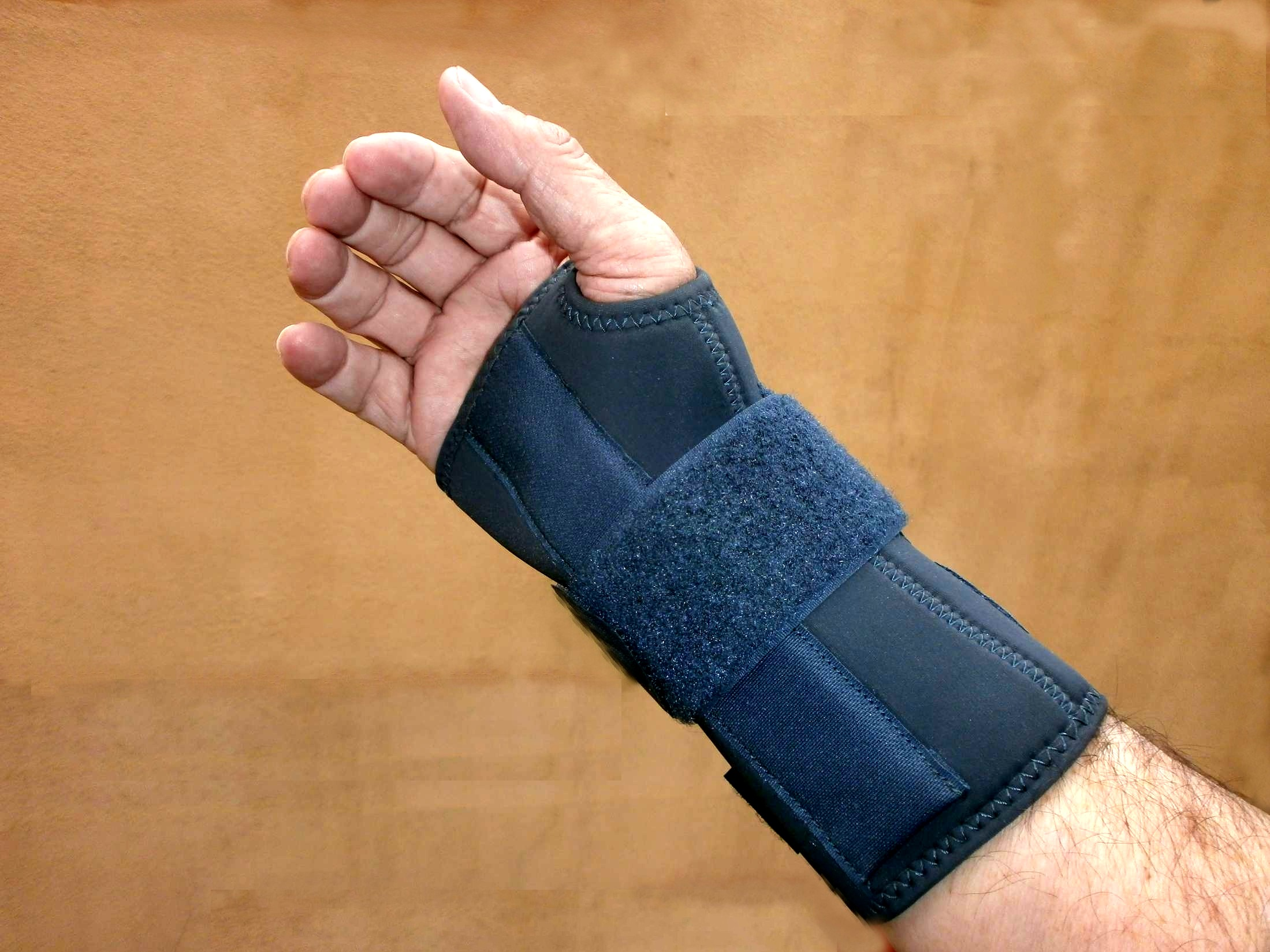
Wrist extensor orthosis reduces the overloading strain at the lesion area

Orthosis is a device externally used on the limb to improve the function or reduce the pain. Orthotics may be useful in tennis elbow; however, long-term effects are unknown. There are two main types of orthoses prescribed for this problem: counterforce elbow orthoses and wrist extension orthoses. Counterforce orthosis has a circumferential structure surrounding the arm. This orthosis usually has a strap which applies a binding force over the origin of the wrist extensors. The applied force by orthosis reduces the elongation within the musculotendinous fibers. Wrist extensor orthosis maintains the wrist in the slight extension.

=== Speculative treatments ===
Other approaches that are not experimentally tested include eccentric exercise using a rubber bar, joint manipulation directed at the elbow and wrist, spinal manipulation directed at the cervical and thoracic spinal regions, low level laser therapy, and extracorporeal shockwave therapy.

=== Medication ===
Oral nonsteroidal anti-inflammatory medications may be effective.

Other studies suggest that, while helpful for short-term pain relief, corticosteroid injections are less effective than watchful waiting or physical therapy after one year. Repeated injections can also lead to tendon rupture and muscle atrophy.

=== Alternative treatments ===
While many alternative treatments, such as shockwave, laser, low-frequency electrical nerve stimulation, ultrasound, and pulsed magnetic wave therapies, have been used, none is effective or in common treatment plans.

The effectiveness of acupuncture for lateral epicondylitits is unproven.

=== Surgery ===
Most patients with tennis elbow do not need surgery, improving with conservative treatments. However, if symptoms persist despite prolonged conservative therapy, surgical options should be reconsidered. Several surgical procedures are available for lateral epicondylitis, most involving the removal of damaged tissue from the ECRB and scraping of the lateral epicondyle. This procedure can be done through open, percutaneous, or arthroscopic methods.

==== Percutaneous surgery ====
Percutaneous surgical approach is mainly used for releasing the common extensor tendon origin at the lateral epicondyle. This technique has been demonstrated to be safe, reliable, and cost-effective Good midterm outcomes in pain relief have been widely reported with a percutaneous surgical approach. However there is some limited evidence reported that arthroscopic and open techniques achieved a better prognosis than the percutaneous surgical approach for the treatment of lateral epicondylitis. In recent years, a new technique termed as ultrasound-guided percutaneous tenotomy has been reported as a safe and effective for the treatment of lateral epicondylitis, with improvements in symptoms, function, and ultrasound imaging at 1-year follow-up.

==== Arthroscopic surgery ====
Arthroscopic surgery is a minimally invasive option for treating lateral epicondylitis. This technique fully visualizes the elbow joint, and leads to a quicker return to work. In the past, studies have shown good long term effects and fewer complications with arthroscopic surgery compared to open or percutaneous approaches. However, the literature is currently mixed with some recent reviews suggest no significant differences among open, arthroscopic, and percutaneous methods regarding recovery time, complication rates, or patient satisfaction. While others state that arthroscopic surgery may allow for a quicker return to work, suggesting a potential advantage in the early postoperative period. While results are generally positive, arthroscopic surgery carries risks of injury to the radial nerve and lateral ulnar collateral ligament.

== Epidemiology ==
Tennis elbow is a commonly seen condition and has been reported to affect 1% to 3% of adults each year. The incidence of lateral elbow tendinosis has declined, which could be due to shifts in diagnostic practices or an actual drop in cases. Understanding the typical disease progression can help patients and providers choose the best treatment approach.

=== Symptoms of lateral epicondylitis ===
Symptoms suggestive of lateral epicondylitis are present in about 1% of the adult population and are most common between ages 40 and 60. The prevalence varies somewhat between studies, likely as a result of varied diagnostic criteria and limited reliability between different observers. The data regarding symptoms of lateral epicondylitis in relation to occupations and sports are inconsistent and inconclusive. The shortcomings of the evidence that addresses the relationship between symptoms and occupation/sport include: variation in diagnostic criteria, limited reliability of diagnosis, confounding association of psychosocial factors, selection bias due to a high non-response rate, and the fact that exposures are usually by subjective patient reports and symptomatic patients might receive greater exposure.

== History ==
German physician F. Runge is usually credited for the first description of the condition, calling it "writer's cramp" (Schreibekrampf) in 1873. Later, it was called as "washer women's elbow". British surgeon Henry Morris published an article in The Lancet describing "lawn tennis arm" in 1883. The popular term "tennis elbow" first appeared the same year in a paper by H. P. Major, described as "lawn-tennis elbow".

== See also ==
- Golfer's elbow
- Olecranon bursitis
- Radial tunnel syndrome
- Repetitive strain injury
