= Extensor carpi radialis brevis muscle =

One of five forearm muscles controlling the wrist

Extensor carpi radialis brevis
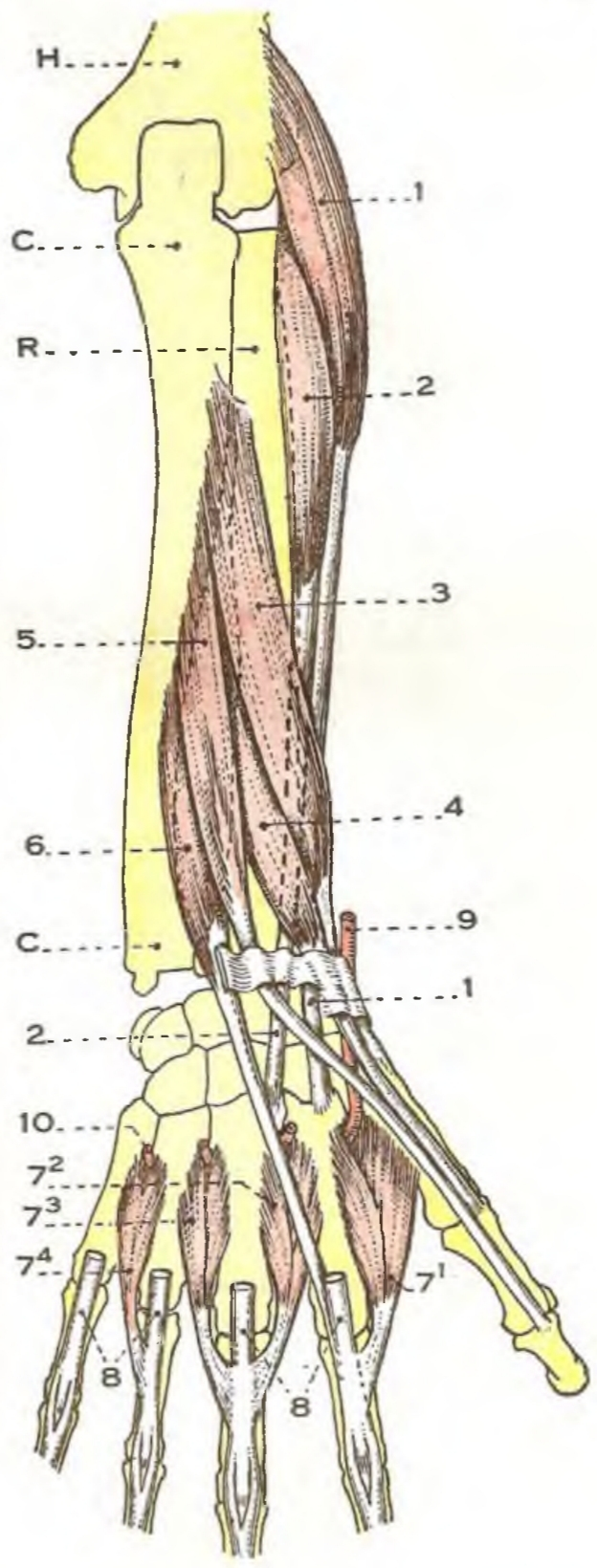
- Posterior surface of the right forearm. Deep muscles. The partially obscured extensor carpi radialis brevis is labeled 2. The extensor carpi radialis longus is labeled 1. (After Testut's Anatomy.)

Details
- Origin: Humerus at the anterior of lateral epicondyle (common extensor tendon)
- Insertion: Posterior base of the 3rd metacarpal
- Artery: Radial artery
- Nerve: Deep branch of the radial nerve
- Actions: Extensor and abductor of the hand at the wrist joint
- Antagonist: Flexor carpi ulnaris muscle

Identifiers
- Latin: musculus extensor carpi radialis brevis
- TA98: A04.6.02.041
- TA2: 2499
- FMA: 38497

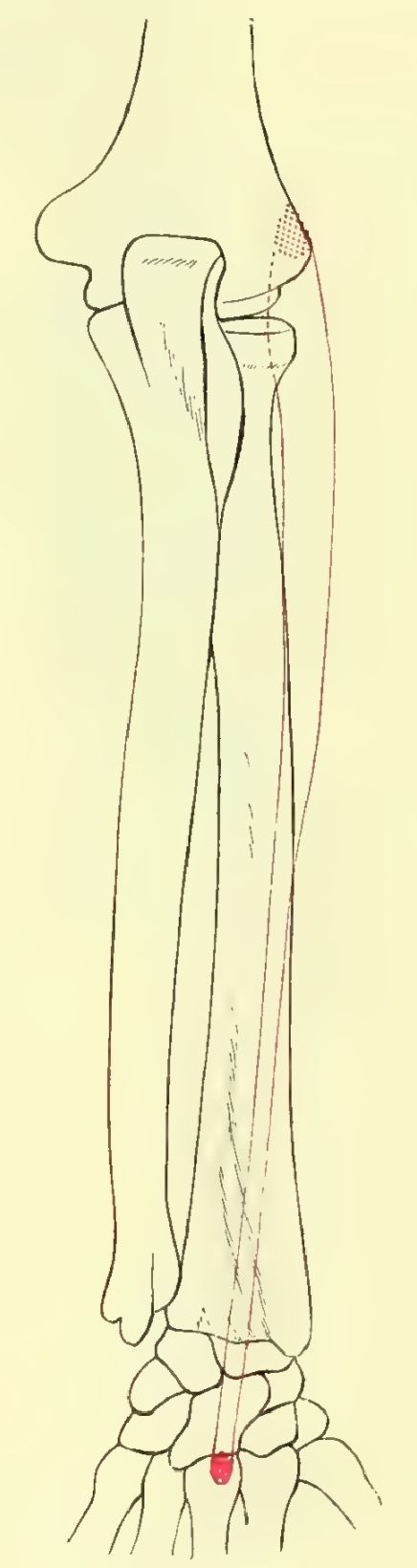
Extensor carpi radialis brevis of the right limb: outline and attachment areas. (After Gerrish.)

In human anatomy, extensor carpi radialis brevis is a muscle in the forearm that acts to extend and abduct the wrist. It is shorter and thicker than its namesake extensor carpi radialis longus which can be found above the proximal end of the extensor carpi radialis brevis.

== Origin and insertion ==
It arises from the lateral epicondyle of the humerus, by the common extensor tendon; from the radial collateral ligament of the elbow-joint; from a strong aponeurosis which covers its surface; and from the intermuscular septa between it and the adjacent muscles.

The fibres end approximately at the middle of the forearm in the form of a flat tendon, which is closely connected with that of the extensor carpi radialis longus, and accompanies it to the wrist; it passes beneath the abductor pollicis longus and extensor pollicis brevis, beneath the extensor retinaculum, and inserts into the dorsal/posterior surface of the base of the metacarpal of the long finger (third metacarpal).

== Relations ==
Under the extensor retinaculum the tendon lies on the back of the radius in a shallow groove, to the ulnar side of that which lodges the tendon of the extensor carpi radialis longus, and separated from it by a faint ridge.

== Innervation ==
Like all the muscles in the posterior forearm, ECR brevis is supplied by a branch of the radial nerve.

== Function ==
It is an extensor, and an abductor of the hand at the wrist joint. That is, it serves to manipulate the wrist so that the fingers moves away from the palm. The muscle, like all extensors of the forearm, can be strengthened by exercise that resist its extension; reverse wrist curls with dumbbells can be performed.

== Additional images ==
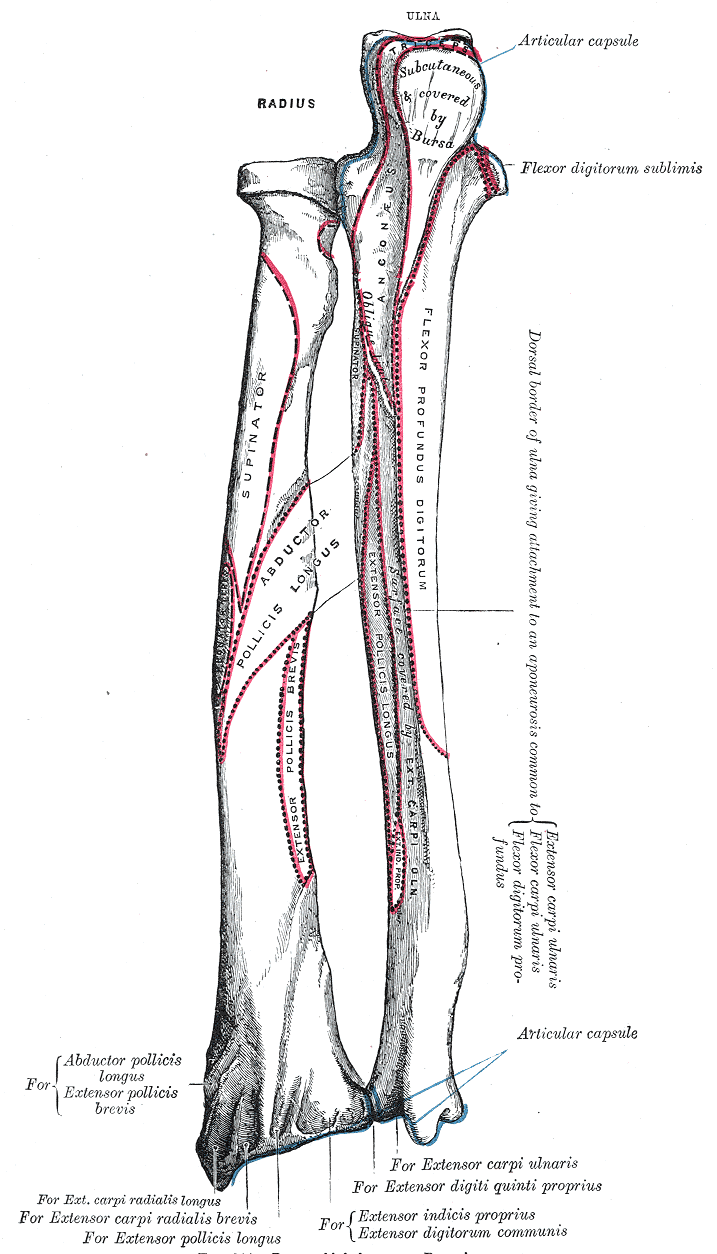
Bones of left forearm. Posterior aspect.

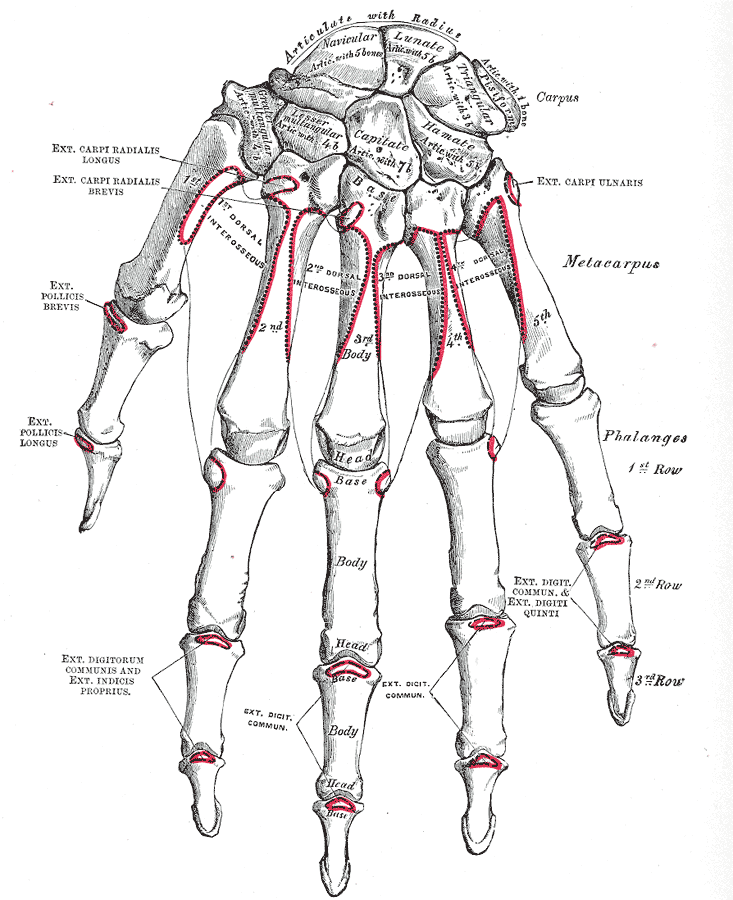
Bones of the left hand. Dorsal surface.

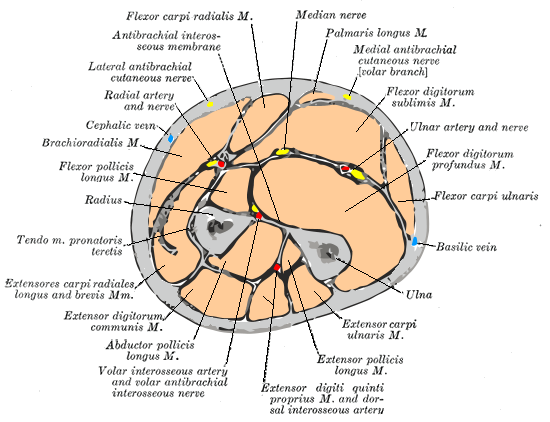
Cross-section through the middle of the forearm.

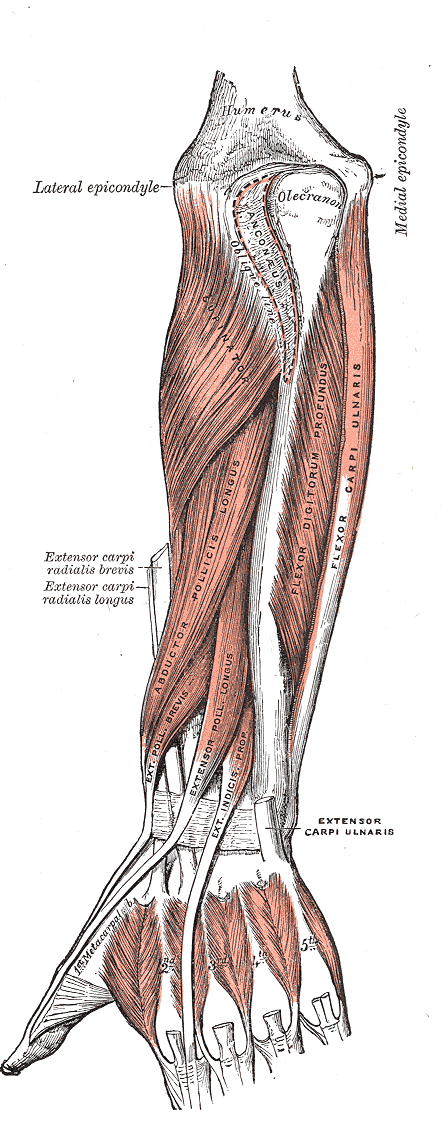
Posterior surface of the forearm. Deep muscles.

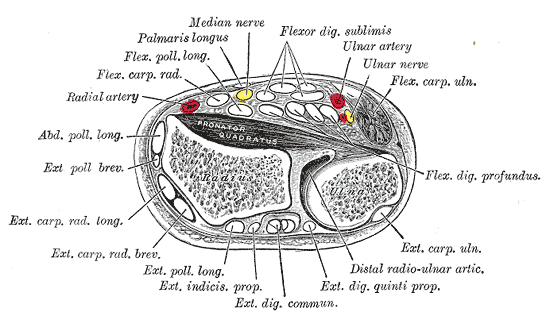
Transverse section across distal ends of radius and ulna.

Transverse section across the wrist and digits.

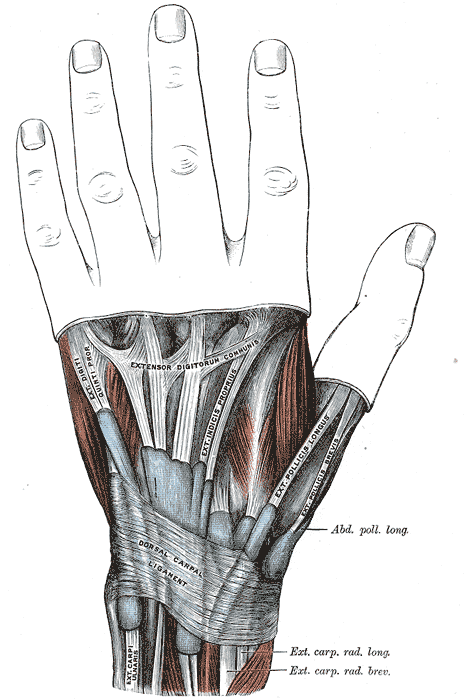
The mucous sheaths of the tendons on the back of the wrist.

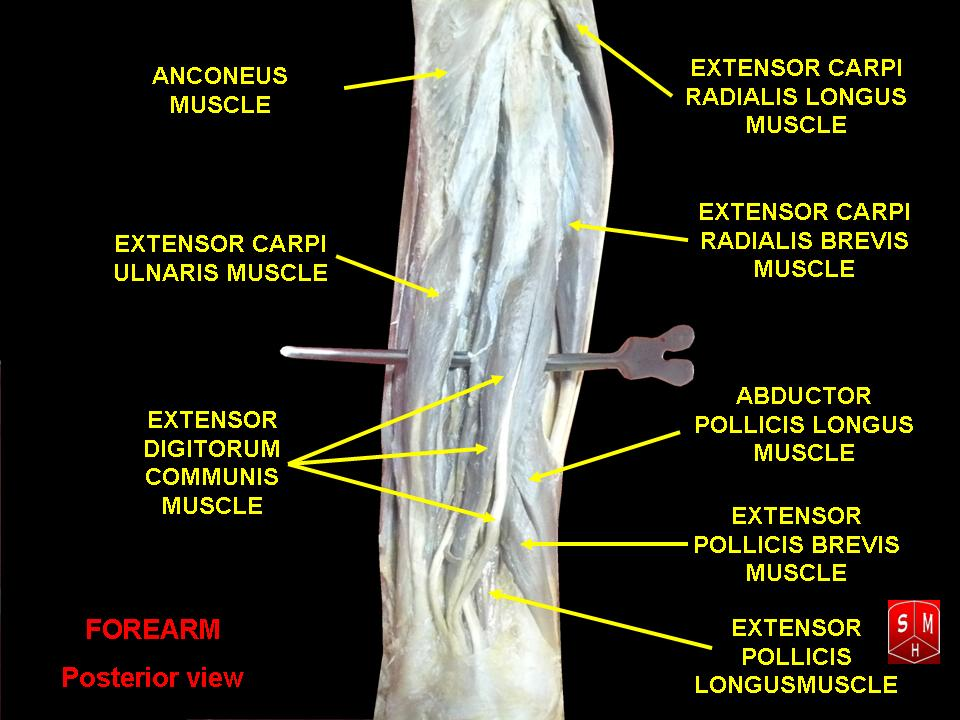
Extensor carpi radialis brevis muscle

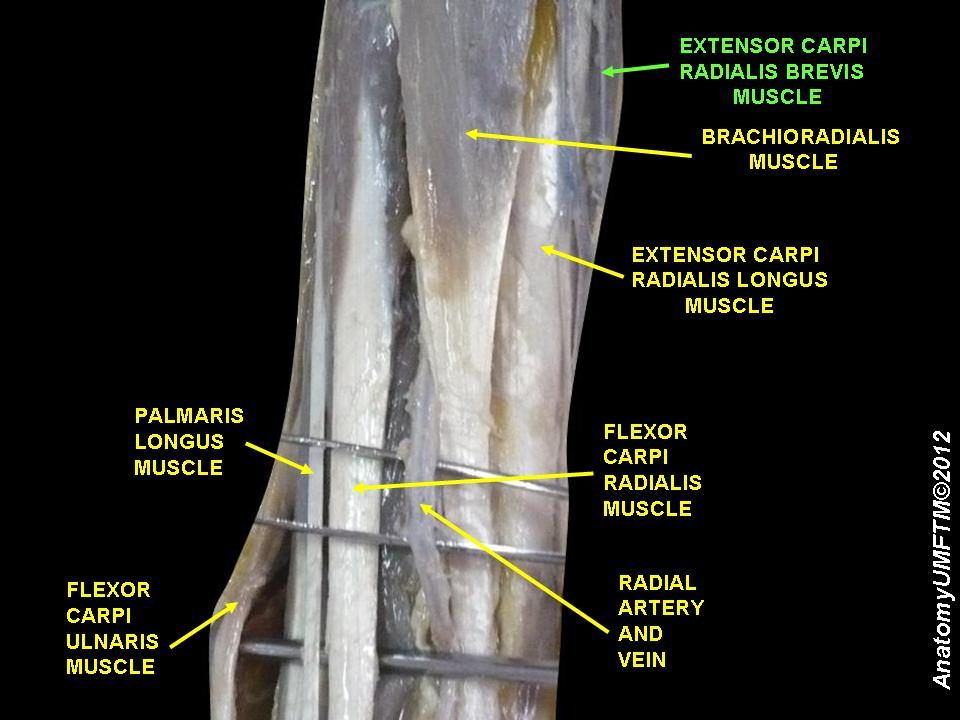
Extensor carpi radialis brevis muscle

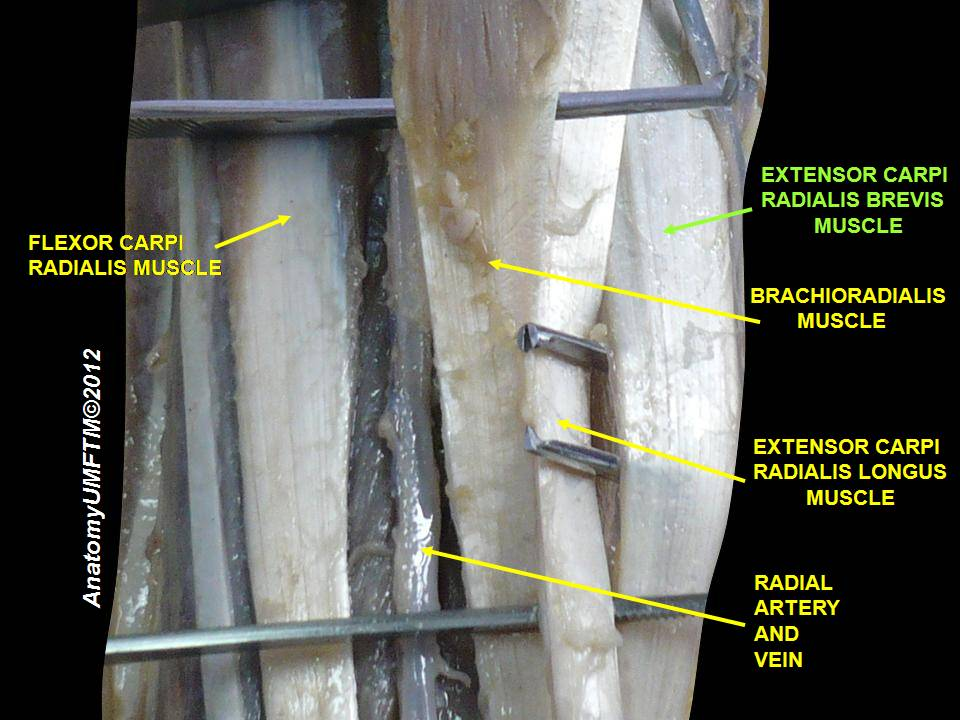
Extensor carpi radialis brevis muscle

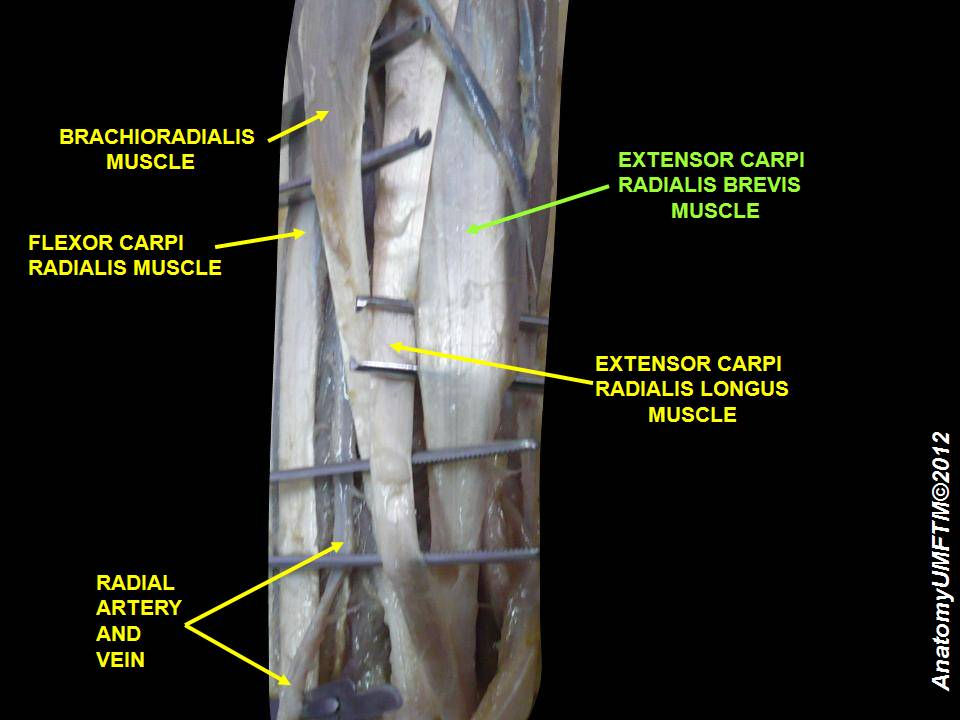
Extensor carpi radialis brevis muscle

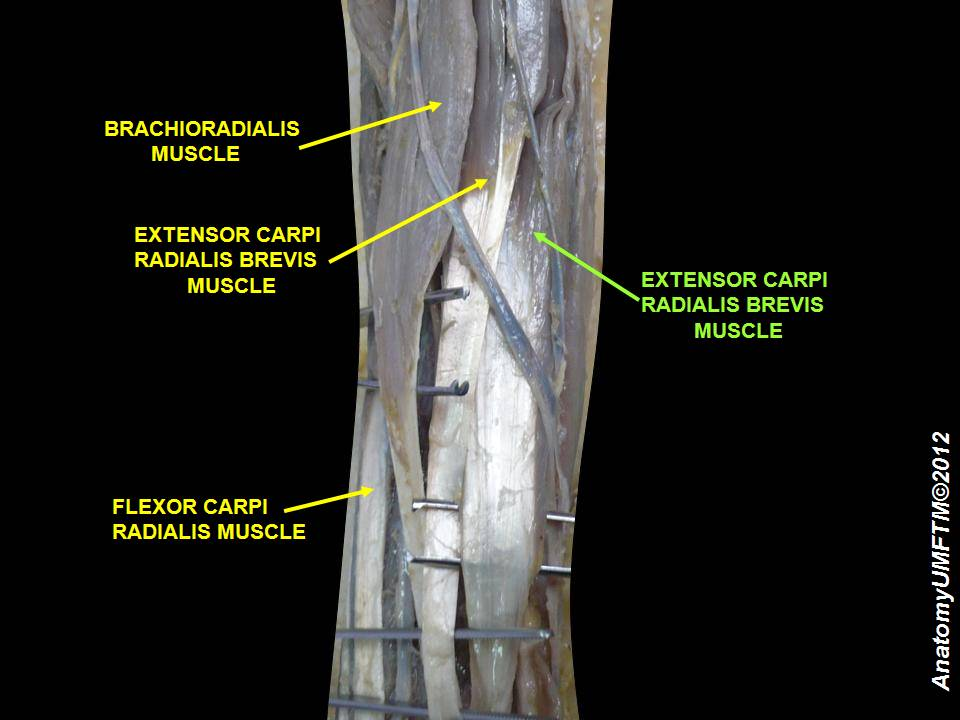
Extensor carpi radialis brevis muscle
