= Supinator muscle =

Muscle of the forearm in humans

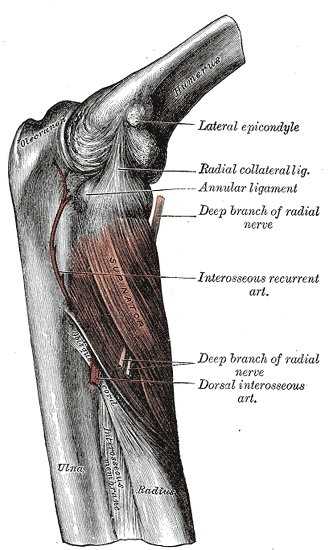
- Posterior view of the supinator. (Right arm.)

Details
- Origin: Lateral epicondyle of humerus, supinator crest of ulna, radial collateral ligament, annular ligament
- Insertion: Lateral proximal radial shaft
- Artery: Radial recurrent artery
- Nerve: Deep branch of the radial nerve
- Actions: Supinates forearm
- Antagonist: Pronator teres, pronator quadratus

Identifiers
- Latin: musculus supinator
- TA98: A04.6.02.048
- TA2: 2512
- FMA: 38512

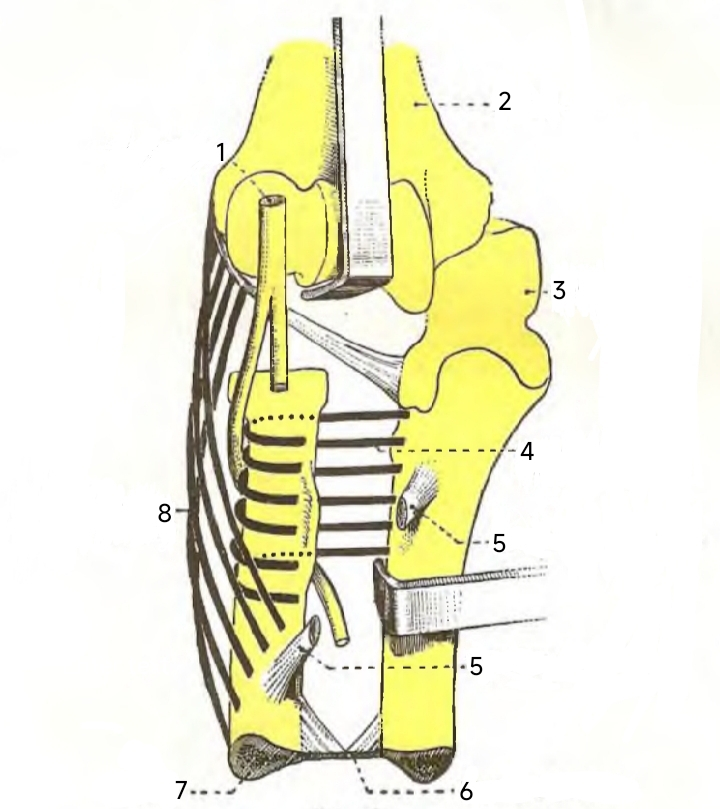
Sketch depicting the constitution of the supinator. 1, radial nerve — 2, humerus — 3, ulna — 4, ulnar portion (pars profunda) — 5, oblique cord (transected) — 6, interosseous membrane — 7, radius — 8, humeral portion (pars superficialis). (After Testut.)

In human anatomy, the supinator (also historically known as the supinator brevis) is a broad muscle in the posterior compartment of the forearm, curved around the upper third of the radius. Its function is to supinate the forearm.

== Structure ==
The supinator consists of two planes of fibers, between which passes the deep branch of the radial nerve. The two planes arise in common—the superficial one originating as tendons and the deeper by muscular fibers—from the supinator crest of the ulna, the lateral epicondyle of the humerus, the radial collateral ligament, and the annular radial ligament.

The superficial fibers (pars superficialis) surround the upper part of the radius, and are inserted into the lateral edge of the radial tuberosity and the oblique line of the radius, as low down as the insertion of the pronator teres. The upper fibers (pars profunda) of the deeper plane form a sling-like fasciculus, which encircles the neck of the radius above the tuberosity and is attached to the back part of its medial surface; the greater part of this portion of the muscle is inserted into the dorsal and lateral surfaces of the body of the radius, midway between the oblique line and the head of the bone.

The proximal aspect of the superficial head is known as the arcade of Frohse or the supinator arch.

=== Innervation ===
It is innervated by the deep division of the radial nerve. The deep division then becomes the posterior interosseous nerve upon exiting the supinator muscle. Its nerve roots are primarily from C6, with some C5 involvement. There is also possible additional C7 innervation.

The radial nerve divides into deep and sensory superficial branches just proximal to the supinator muscle—an arrangement that can lead to entrapment and compression of the deep part, potentially resulting in selective paralysis of the muscles served by this nerve (the extensor muscles and the abductor pollicis longus.) Many possible causes are known for this nerve syndrome, known as supinator entrapment syndrome, including compression by various soft-tissued masses surrounding the nerve, and stress caused by repetitive supination and pronation.

=== Variation ===
The deep radial nerve passes through the belly of supinator in 70% of cases and via the arcade of Frohse in remaining cases.

== Function ==
Encircling the radius, supinator brings the hand into the supinated position. In contrast to the biceps brachii, it is able to do this in all positions of elbow flexion and extension.

Supinator always acts together with biceps, except when the elbow joint is extended. It is the most active muscle in forearm supination during unresisted supination, while biceps becomes increasingly active with heavy loading. Supination strength decreases by 64% if supinator is disabled by, for example, injury.

== History ==
=== Etymology ===
The term "supinator" can also refer more generally to a muscle that causes supination of a part of the body. In older texts, the term "supinator longus" was used to refer to the brachioradialis, and "supinator brevis" was used to describe the muscle now known as the supinator.

== Additional images ==
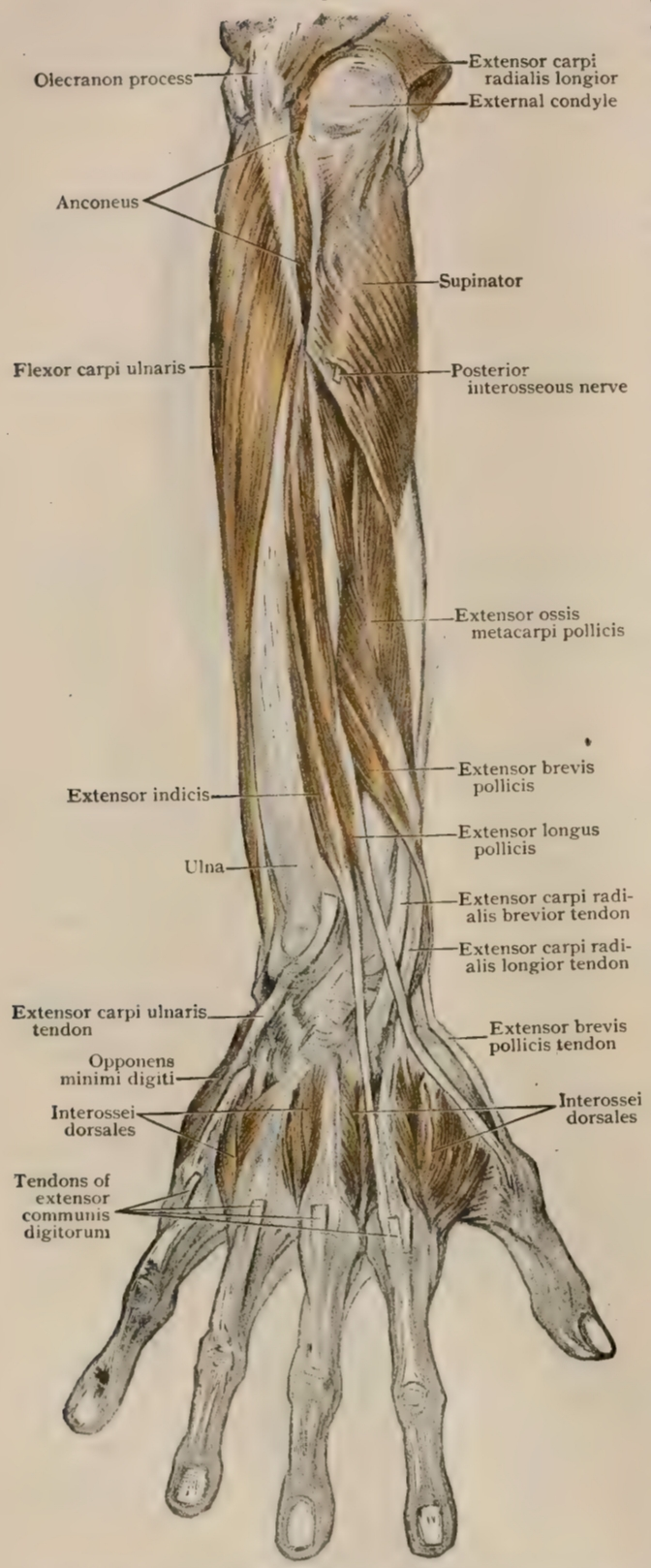
Dissection of posterior aspect of right-sided forearm and hand, depicting deep muscles. (From Piersol's Anatomy.)

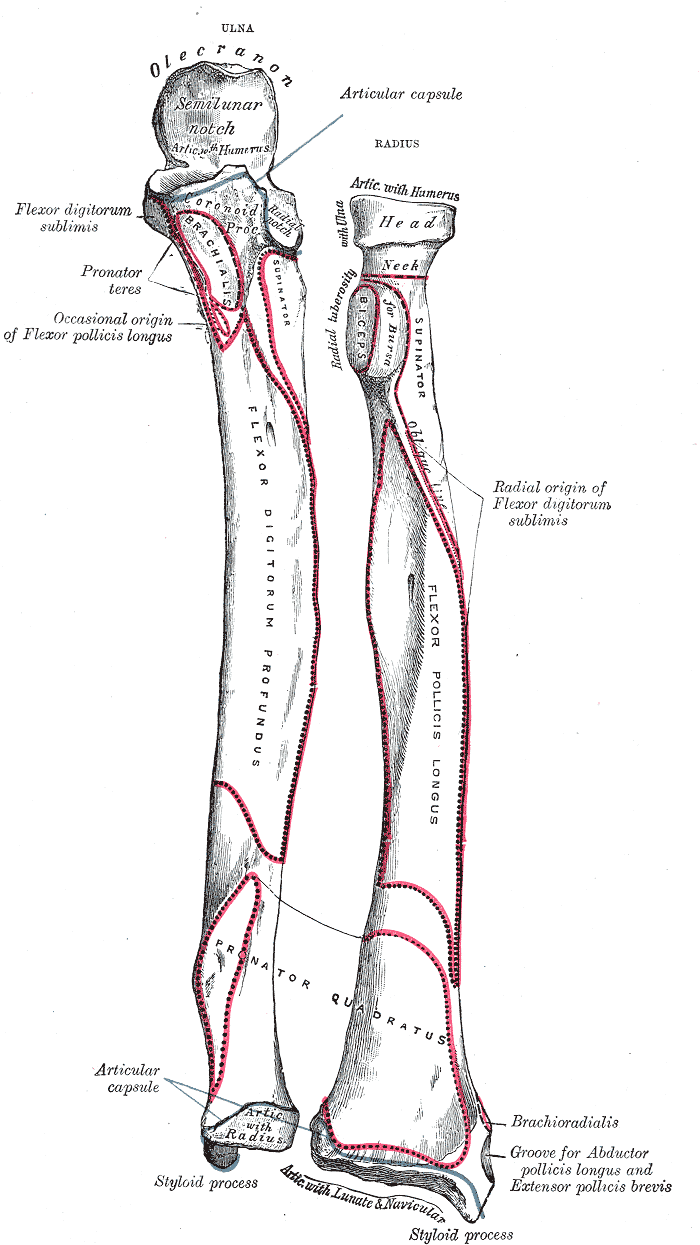
Bones of left forearm. Anterior aspect.

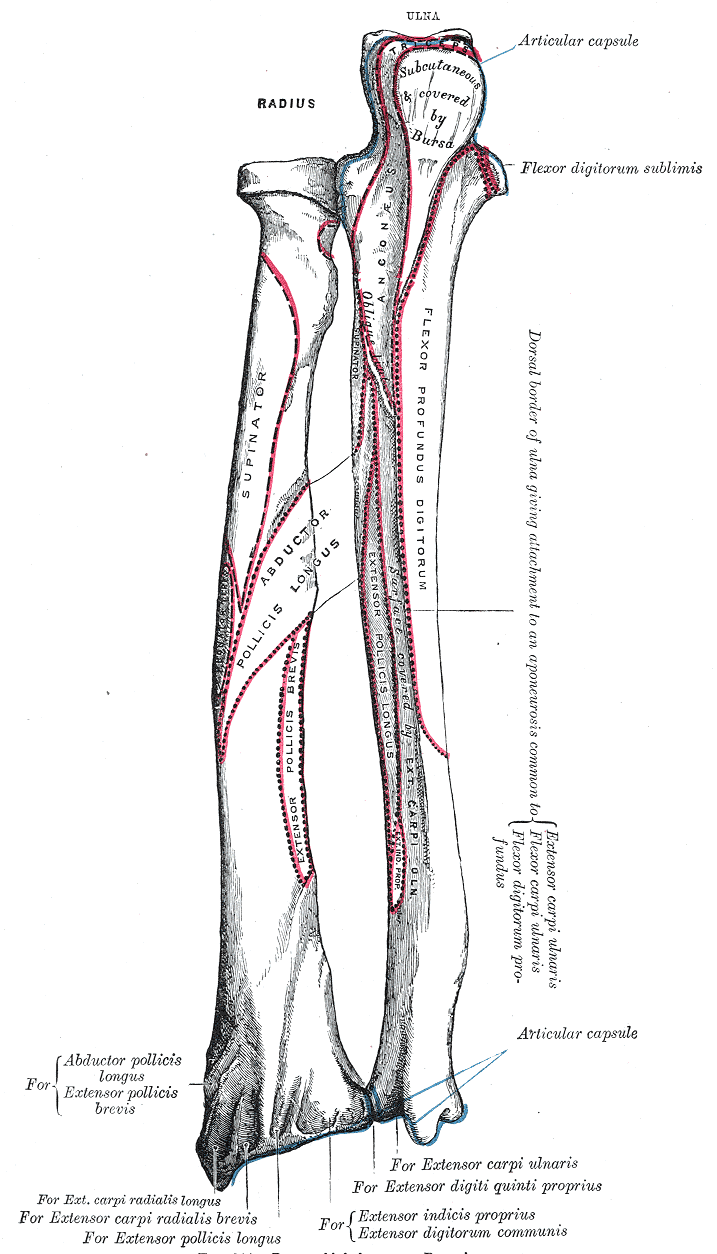
Bones of left forearm. Posterior aspect.

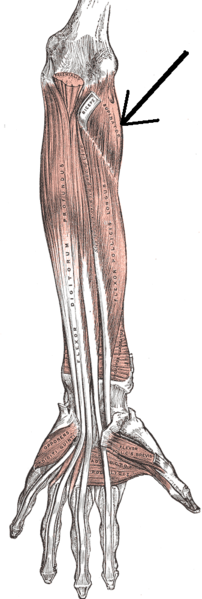
Front of the left forearm. Deep muscles.

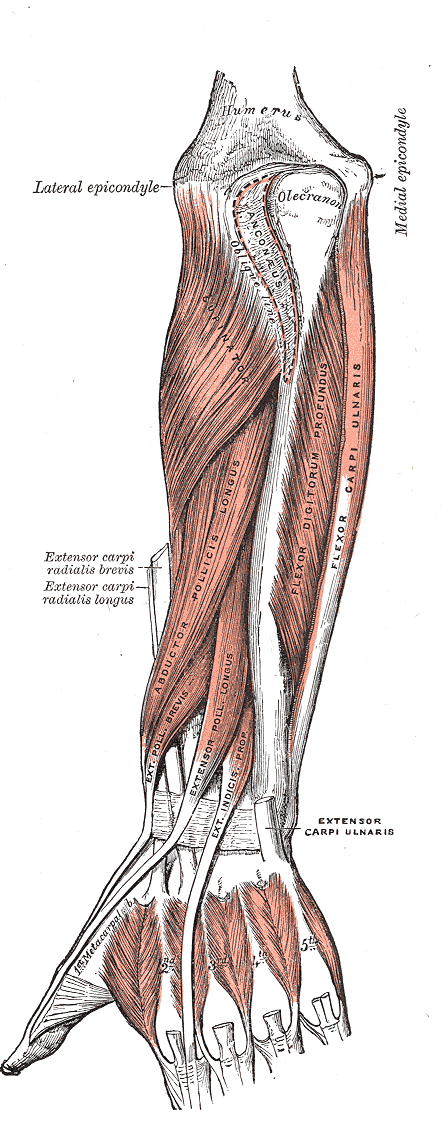
Posterior surface of the left forearm. Deep muscles.

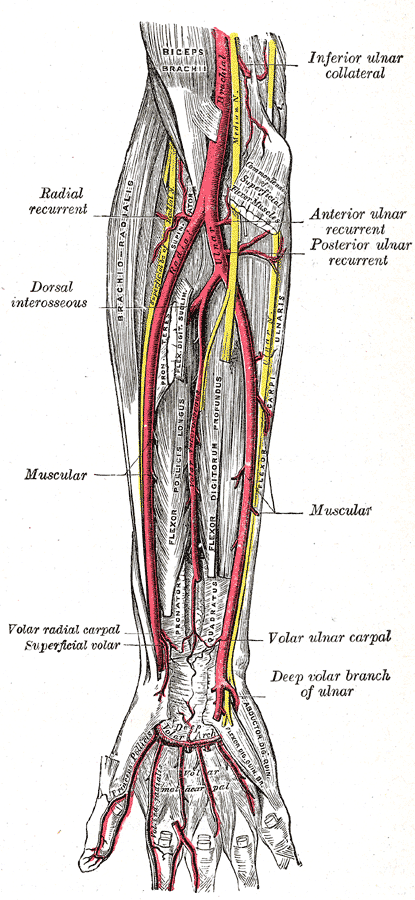
Ulnar and radial arteries. Deep view. Right upper limb.

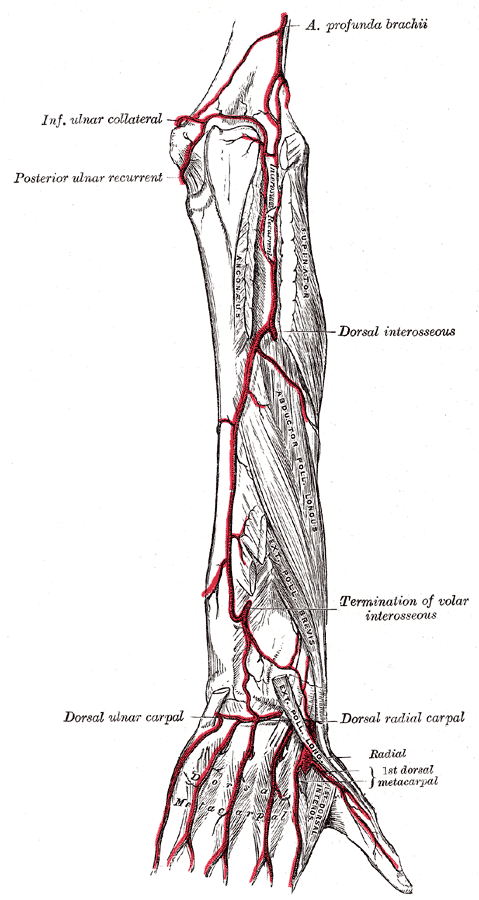
Arteries of the back of the forearm and hand. Right upper limb.

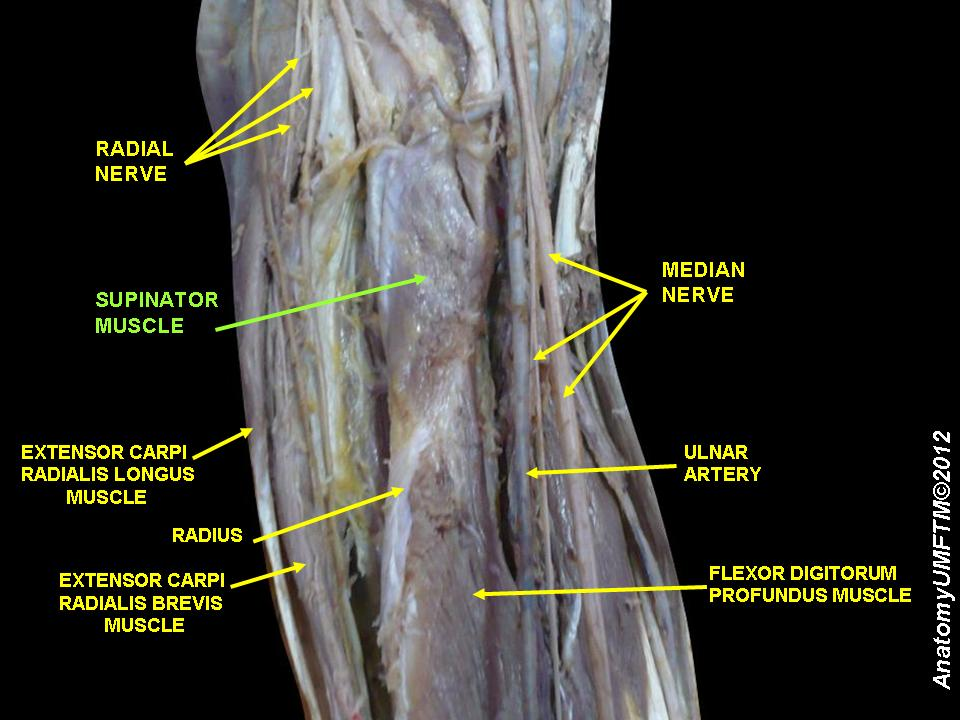
Dissection of right upper limb, showing supinator muscle and surrounding anatomy.

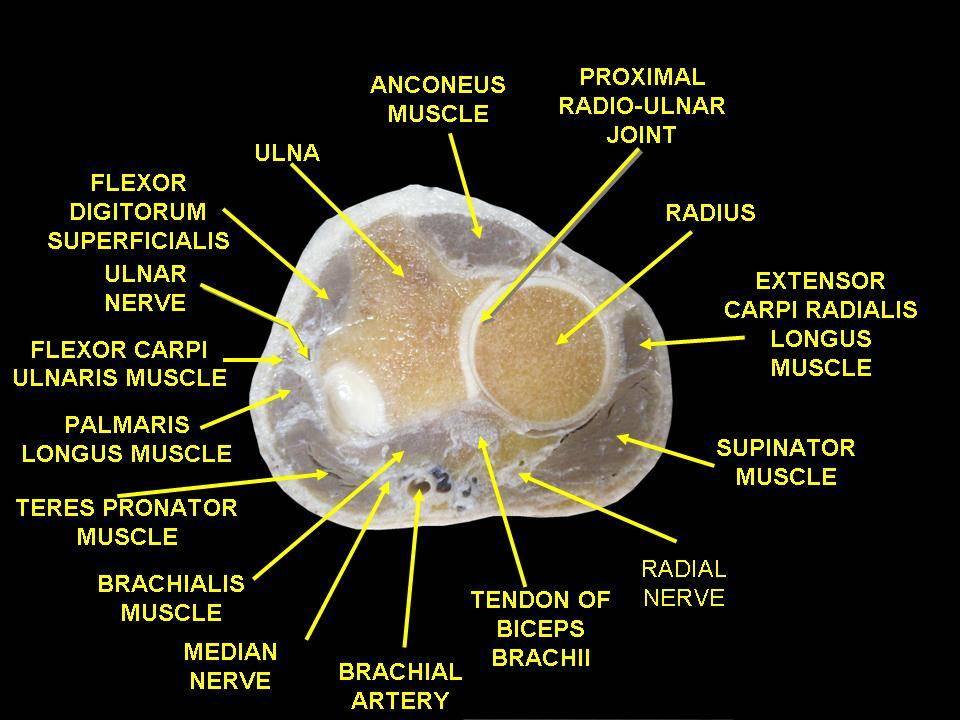
Cross section of cadaveric left forearm, showing musculature and bones.

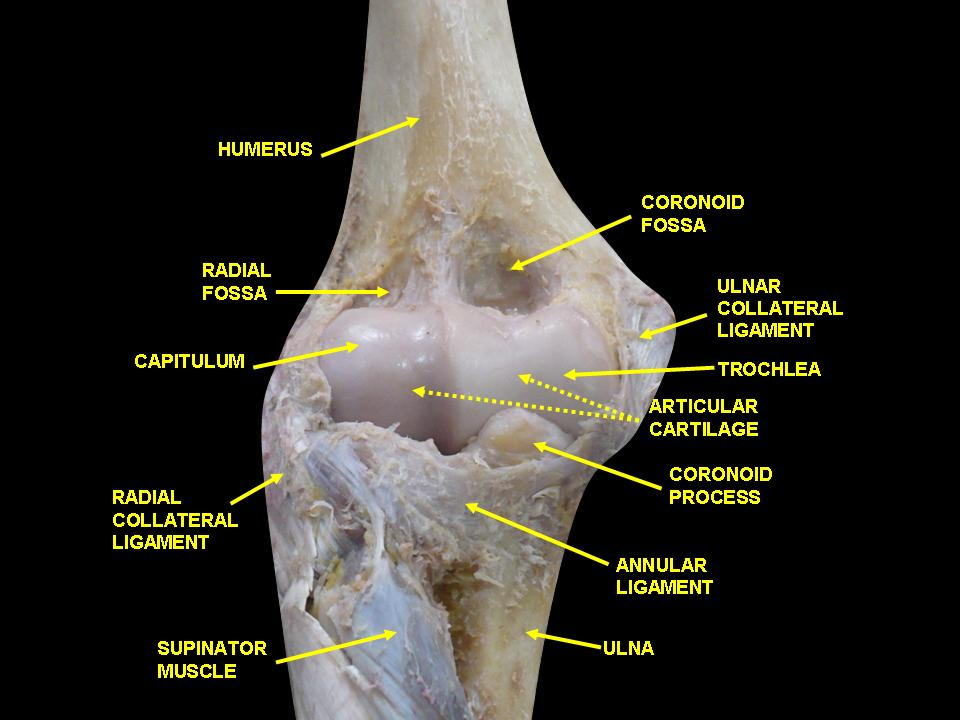
Elbow joint. Deep dissection. Anterior view. Right upper limb.
