= Arcade of Frohse =

Part of the supinator muscle

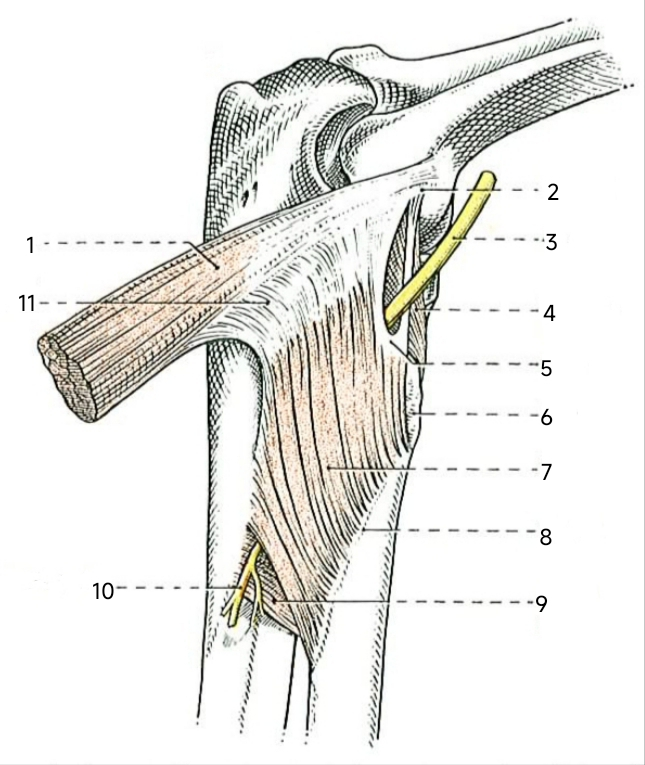
- Supinator muscle and deep division of radial nerve; right side, lateral view. 1. Extensor digitorum — 2. Lateral epicondyle — 3 & 10. Deep division of radial nerve — 4. Supinator (pars profunda, upper fibers) — 5. Arcade of Fröhse — 6. Bicipital tuberosity — 7. Supinator (pars superficialis) — 8. Oblique line of radius — 9. Supinator (pars profunda, lower fibers) — 11. Aponeurotic expansion of extensor digitorum. (After Charpy.)

Arcade of Frohse, sometimes called the supinator arch, is the most superior part of the superficial layer of the supinator muscle, and is a fibrous arch over the deep division of the radial nerve.

The arcade of Frohse is a site of interosseous posterior nerve entrapment, and is believed to play a role in causing progressive paralysis of the posterior interosseous nerve, both with and without injury.

The arcade of Frohse was named after German anatomist, Fritz Frohse (1871–1916).
