= Deep branch of radial nerve =

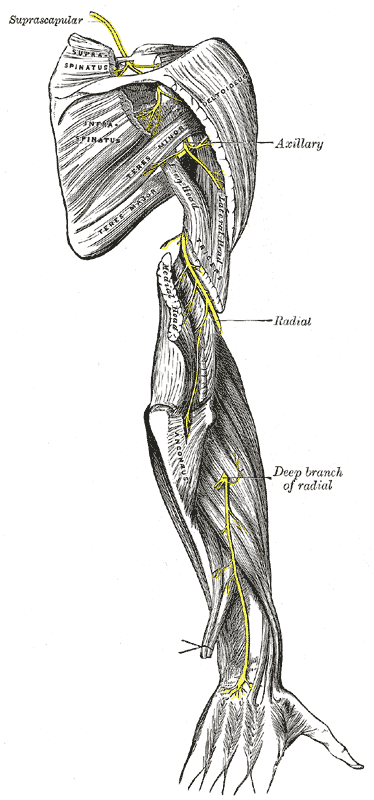
- The suprascapular, axillary, and radial nerves. (Deep branch of radial labeled at right.)

Details
- From: Radial nerve

Identifiers
- Latin: ramus profundus nervi radialis, nervus interosseus dorsalis
- TA98: A14.2.03.054
- TA2: 6436

The radial nerve divides into a superficial (sensory) and deep (motor) branch at the cubital fossa. The deep branch of the radial nerve winds to the back of the forearm around the lateral side of the radius between the two planes of fibers of the supinator, and is prolonged downward between the superficial and deep layers of muscles, to the middle of the forearm. The deep branch provides motor function to the muscles in the posterior compartment of the forearm, which is mostly the extensor muscles of the hand.

The radial nerve arises from the posterior cord of the brachial plexus. The posterior cord takes nerves from the upper, lower, and middle trunk, so ultimately the radial nerve is formed from the anterior rami of C5 through T1.

The radial nerve passes through the axilla, which makes it susceptible to injury. It can be compressed against the humerus by crutches, causing crutch paralysis. Symptoms of damage to the deep branch of the radial nerve typically include "wrist drop", which is the extension of fingers, hand, and wrist, since the extensor muscles supplied by the nerve are paralyzed. Normal sensation of the skin is retained, since this nerve only provides sensory function to ligaments and articulations of the carpal and metacarpal joints.

Since the nerve passes dorsally around the head of the radius, it is susceptible to traction or compression injuries when the elbow joint is injured, in particular, radial dislocation. Another area of potential entrapment is the arcade of Frohse, a fibrous arch formed from the proximal part of the superficial head of the supinator, under which the deep branch of the radial nerve passes. The passage for the nerve varies in size. In some cases of spontaneous paralysis of the nerve, releasing this fibrous band released pressure on the nerve and restored function

Considerably diminished in size, it descends as the posterior interosseous nerve.

For some authors, the deep branch of the radial nerve is the same as the posterior interosseous nerve.

== Additional images ==
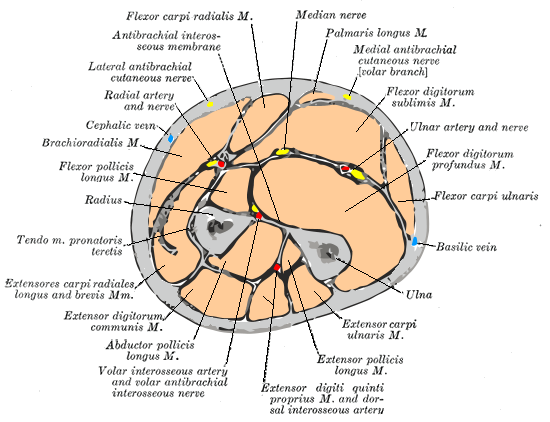
Cross-section through the middle of the forearm.

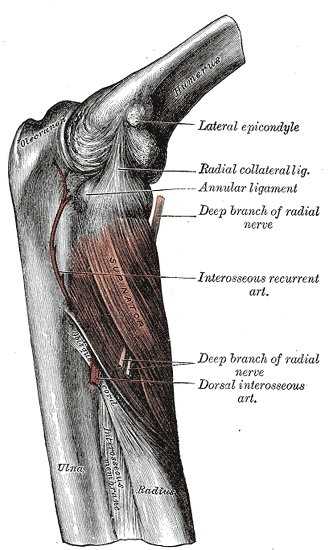
The supinator.

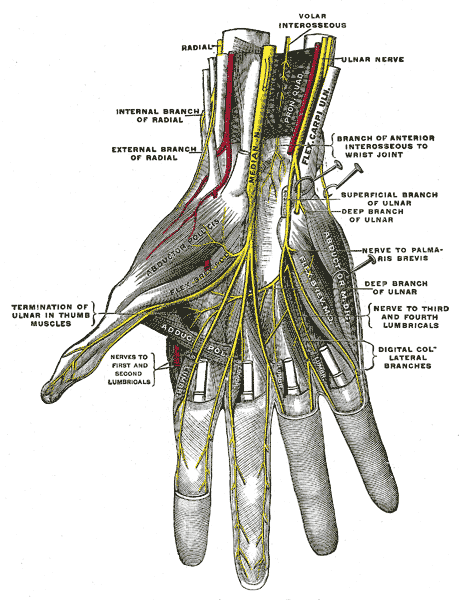
Deep palmar nerves.
