= Palmar =

Palmar may refer to:

== Anatomy, relating to the palm of the hand ==
- Palmar aponeurosis, deep fascia connecting and within the muscles of the palm
- Palmar arches (disambiguation), various combinations of arteries in the hand and arm
- Palmar arteries (disambiguation), several sets of arteries in the hand
- Palmar branch of the median nerve, a branch of the median nerve that arises at the lower part of the forearm.
- Palmar branch of ulnar nerve, continuation of one branch of the ulnar nerve into the hand
- Palmar carpal branch:
  - Palmar carpal branch of radial artery, a small blood vessel that crosses the wrist bones to join with the palmar branch of the ulnar artery
  - Palmar carpal branch of ulnar artery, a small blood vessel that crosses the wrist bones to join with the palmar branch of the radial artery
- Palmar carpal ligament, the thickened portion of the deep forearm fascia on the front of the wrist
- Palmar crease, a crease in the surface of the palm
- Palmar digital nerves (disambiguation), several sets of nerves in the fingers
- Palmar digital veins, blood vessels on the palm side of the fingers
- Palmar erythema, reddening of the palms
- Palmar grasp reflex, a primitive reflex seen in newborns
- Palmar radioulnar ligament, a narrow band of fibers in the wrist joining the ends of the arm bones

== Places ==
Belize

- San Jose Palmar, a village in Orange Walk District

Colombia

- Palmar, Santander, a municipality in the Santander Department
- Palmar de Varela, a municipality and town in the department of Atlántico

Costa Rica

- Palmar Norte (North Palmar), a town in the Osa region, Puntarenas province
- Palmar Sur (South Palmar), a town in the Osa region, Puntarenas province

Dominican Republic

- Palmar Arriba, a town in the Santiago province
- Palmar de Ocoa, a town in the Azua province

Mexico

- Palmar de Bravo, a town and municipality in the state of Puebla

Puerto Rico

- Palmar, Aguadilla, Puerto Rico, a rural barrio in the municipality of Aguadilla

Spain

- El Palmar de Troya, a small village near Utrera, in Andalusia

Uruguay

- Palmar, Uruguay, a town in Soriano Department
- Punta Palmar, a headland in Rocha Department
  - Punta Palmar lighthouse, a lighthouse in the namesake headland

Venezuela

- Palmar River, a river in Zulia State

== People ==
- Wally Palmar (born Volodymyr Palamarchuk; 1954), American musician, singer, songwriter and composer

== Other uses ==
- Palmar (football club), a football club in São Tomé and Príncipe
- Palmar de Junco, a sports venue in the neighborhood of Pueblo Nuevo, Matanzas, Cuba
- Our Lady of Palmar, Marian apparition
- Palmarian Catholic Church, Independent Catholic denomination
- Cathedral-Basilica of Our Crowned Mother of Palmar, Palmarian Catholic cathedral

== See also ==
- Palma (disambiguation)
- Palmares (disambiguation)
- Palmer (disambiguation)
- Volar (disambiguation), an anatomical term sometimes used as a synonym
