= Carpal branch of the ulnar artery =

carpal branch of the ulnar artery may refer to:

- Dorsal carpal branch of the ulnar artery
- Palmar carpal branch of ulnar artery
