= Federal Medical Center, Lexington =

United States federal prison in Kentucky

Coordinates: 38°06′20″N 84°33′37″W

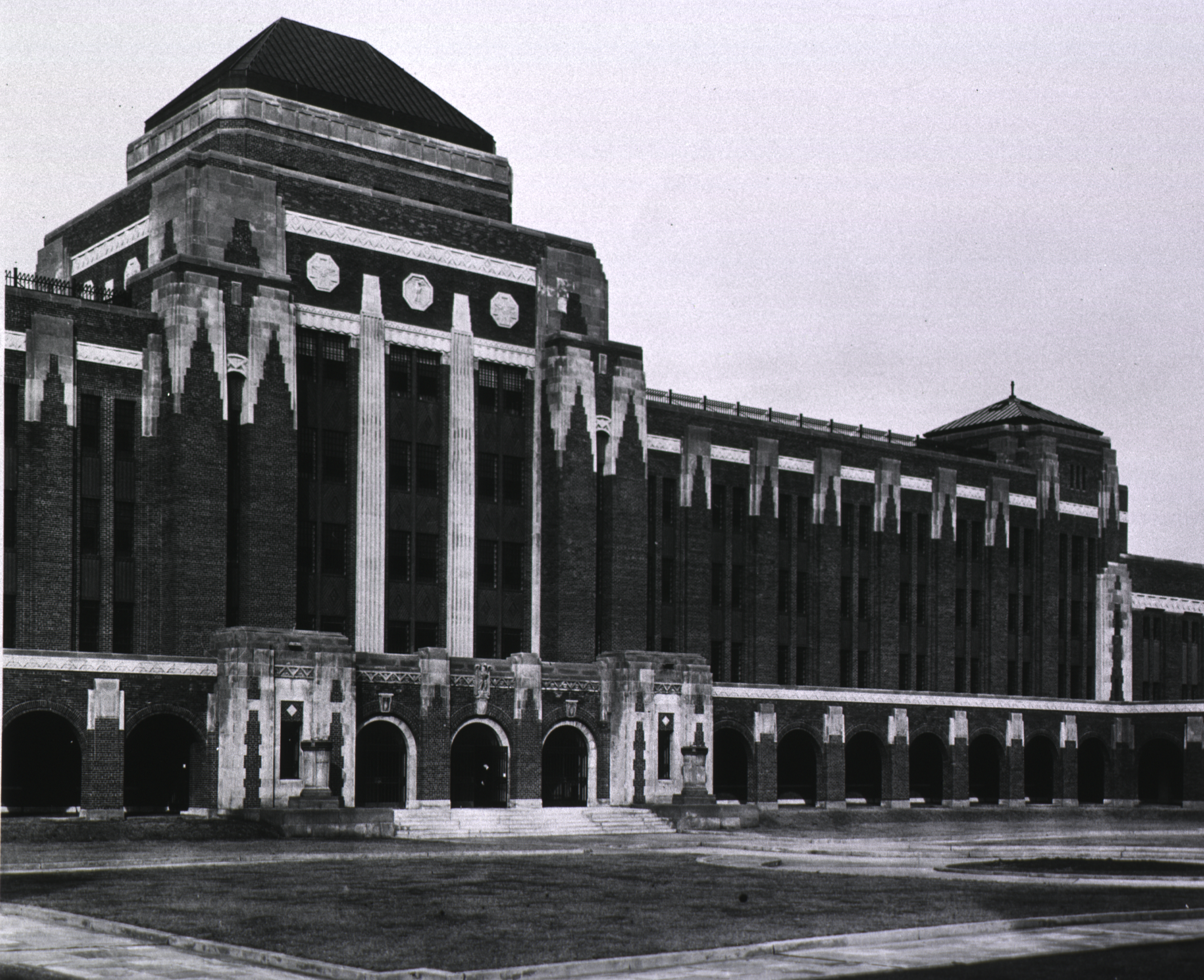
- Interactive map of Federal Medical Center, Lexington
- Location: Fayette County, Kentucky
- Status: Operational
- Security class: Administrative facility (with minimum-security prison camp)
- Population: 1,950 (330 in prison camp)
- Opened: 1935 (designated as federal prison in 1974)
- Managed by: Federal Bureau of Prisons
- Warden: Corey Kirby

The Federal Medical Center, Lexington (FMC Lexington) is a United States federal prison in Kentucky for male or female inmates requiring medical or mental health care. It is designated as an administrative facility, which means that it holds inmates of all security classifications. It is operated by the Federal Bureau of Prisons, a division of the United States Department of Justice. The facility also has an adjacent minimum-security satellite camp for female inmates.

FMC Lexington is located 7 miles (11 km) north of Lexington and 20 miles (32 km) southeast of Frankfort, the state capital.

== History ==
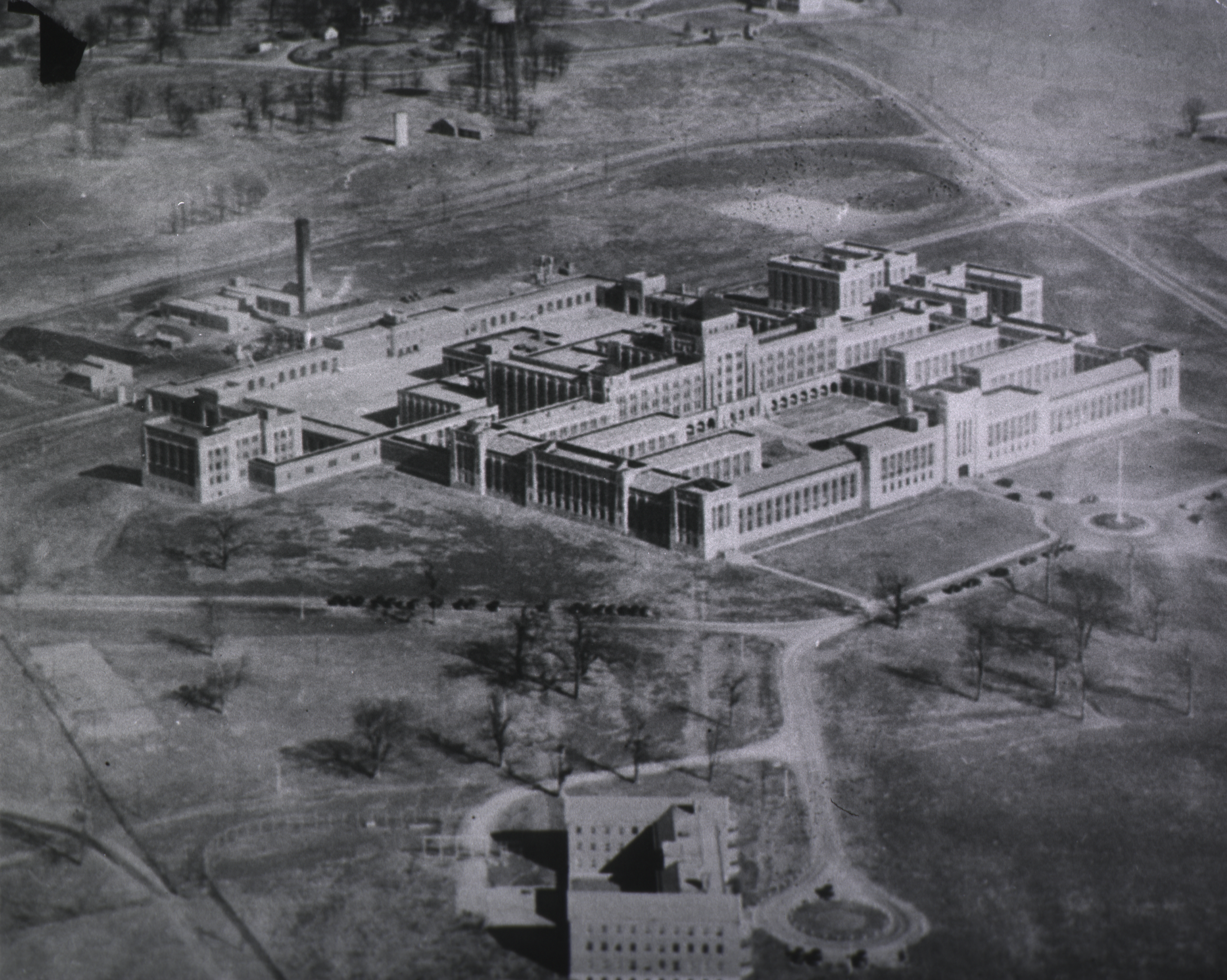
Undated aerial view of the hospital

The site opened on May 15, 1935, on 1,000 acres (400 ha) under the name "United States Narcotic Farm" then changed shortly after to "U.S. Public Health Service Hospital." During World War II, it was used as a temporary internment center for the detainment of mostly innocent German, Japanese, and Italian Americans. In 1967, it changed its name again to "National Institute of Mental Health, Clinical Research Center." Its original purpose was to treat people who "voluntarily" were admitted with drug abuse problems and treat them, with mostly experimental treatments; it was the first of its kind in the United States. The 1,050-acre (420 ha) site included a farm where patients would work.

Throughout the life of the institution as a prison/hospital, approximately two-thirds of those sent to the U.S. Public Health Service Hospital were considered volunteers. While many traveled to the institution on their own to volunteer for treatment, other so-called volunteers were in fact motivated to go there in lieu of federal sentencing. The remaining one-third of the prison's population, which reached 1,499 inmates at its peak, were there due to federal charges either directly or indirectly related to drug use.

In 1974, the institution became a federal prison but maintained a "psychiatric hospital" title until 1998, the year 2 inmates killed another with a fire extinguisher. Most psychiatric patients were subsequently moved to other federal medical centers, although the change in mission was due to the psychiatric function being transferred to a new Federal Medical Center in Devens, Massachusetts, and not the homicide.

== Literature ==
- In Nelson Algren's novel The Man With the Golden Arm and the 1955 screen adaptation, the main character Frankie the Machine, a morphine addict, returns to his Chicago neighborhood after being detoxed at the Lexington Medical Center.
- In William S. Burroughs' book Junkie, the autobiographical main character spends a period of time at "Lexington," where he checks himself in voluntarily in order to quit his heroin addiction. Burroughs and his son, William Seward Burroughs III, were both patients at the facility.
- In Alexander King's book Mine Enemy Grows Older, King recounts his sojourns at "Lexington Bluegrass Hospital," where he "heard the best jazz ever played anywhere" by a continually changing lineup of famous jazz musicians, all there voluntarily for treatment for heroin addiction.
- In Gayl Jones' novel Corregidora, set around Lexington, KY, the character Jeffrene is described, late in the story, as working at the narcotics hospital.

== Notable inmates (current and former) ==
=== Current ===
Inmate	Register Number	Photo	Status	Details
Jerry Harris	55287-424		Serving a 12-year sentence; scheduled for release on January 18, 2031.	American former cheerleader and convicted child sex offender who received national recognition after appearing in the 2020 Netflix docuseries Cheer. In 2022, Harris plead guilty to receiving child pornography and engaging in interstate travel for the purpose of engaging in illicit sexual conduct with a minor under the age of 15.
Joseph Maldonado-Passage ("Joe Exotic")	26154-017		Serving a 21-year sentence; scheduled for release on April 28, 2036.	Zoo operator and country musician; convicted of 8 Lacey Act violations, 8 Endangered Species Act violations, and 2 counts of murder-for-hire after plotting to kill Carole Baskin, chief executive officer of an animal rescue organization. Subject of the TV documentary miniseries Tiger King: Murder, Mayhem and Madness.

=== Former ===
† Inmates released from custody prior to 1982 are not listed on the Federal Bureau of Prisons website.

Inmate	Register Number	Photo	Status	Details
Narseal Batiste	76736-004		Served a 13-year sentence; released from custody on March 23, 2018.	Leader of the Universal Divine Saviors religious cult; convicted of terrorism conspiracy in 2009 for masterminding a foiled plot to bomb the Sears Tower in Chicago. Four co-conspirators were also convicted.
Larry Langford	27349-001		Sentenced to 15 years. Released on compassionate grounds on December 29, 2018, and died on January 8, 2019.	Former mayor of Birmingham, Alabama, sentenced for conspiracy to commit bribery, and wire fraud
Susan Rosenberg	03684-016		Released in 2001 after her sentence was commuted by President Bill Clinton; served 16 years of a 58-year sentence.	Political activist and former member of the May 19th Communist Organization, a terrorist group which carried out bombings of government facilities and bank robberies in the 1980s; convicted of possessing explosives in 1984.
Silvia Baraldini	05125-054		Transferred to an Italian prison in 1999 while serving a 40-year sentence.	Political activist from Italy; convicted of racketeering in 1982 for taking part in two armored truck robberies, as well as for aiding convicted murderer Assata Shakur escape from prison.
Wayne Kramer	Unlisted†		Held at FMC Lexington in the 1970s; served 2 years.	Guitarist and co-founder of the Detroit rock band MC5; convicted of selling cocaine to undercover police officers.
Norman Hsu	60590-054		Served a 10-year sentence; released from custody on May 28, 2019.	Convicted of campaign finance law violations.
Red Rodney	Unlisted†		Held at FMC Lexington in the 1970s; served 27 months.	Bop and hard bop trumpeter; convicted of fraud and theft for impersonating an Army officer in order to steal $10,000 from the Atomic Energy Commission of San Francisco.
Leona Helmsley	15113-054		Released in January 1994 after serving 18 months of a 4-year sentence.	Billionaire real estate investor and hotel owner; convicted of income tax fraud in 1989.
Daniel Cowart	22540-076		Served a 14-year sentence; released on September 25, 2020.	White supremacist; pleaded guilty in 2010 to plotting the assassination of then-presidential nominee Barack Obama in 2008.
Mutulu Shakur	83205-012		Served 36 years of a 60-year sentence; released on December 16, 2022. Died on July 6, 2023.	Convicted in connection with a 1981 bank robbery and shootout during which Brink's guard Peter Paige, as well as Sergeant Edward O'Grady and Police Officer Waverly Brown of the Nyack Police Department in New York State, were killed. Shakur was the stepfather of rapper Tupac Shakur.
Julie Chrisley	72601-019		Served 2 years and 4 months of a 7-year prison sentence. Released on May 28, 2025 after receiving a pardon from President Donald Trump.	Reality television personality featured on Chrisley Knows Best. Convicted along with her husband Todd Chrisley of bank fraud and tax evasion.
Mike McClain	27683-509		Released on April 15, 2026 pending new trial.	Former Illinois state legislator and lobbyist who was a member of the so-called "ComEd Four," a group of four executives and lobbyists for Commonwealth Edison who sought to influence former Illinois Speaker of the House Michael Madigan through bribery. McClain's relationship with Madigan stemmed as far back as the 1970s, when they were both Illinois state representatives. McClain began serving a two prison sentence at FMC Lexington for an Illinois-based federal Foreign Corrupt Practices Act conviction at the prison's Care Level 2 facility on December 30, 2025. Released on bail on April 15, 2026.

== See also ==
- List of U.S. federal prisons
- Federal Bureau of Prisons
- Incarceration in the United States
