= Palmares =

Palmares may refer to:

- Palmares, Pernambuco, a municipality in the state of Pernambuco in Brazil
- Palmares Paulista
- Palmares (canton), a canton in the province of Alajuela in Costa Rica
- Palmares de Alajuela, a city and district in the canton of Palmares in the province of Alajuela in Costa Rica
- Palmarès, a rider's accomplishments in professional cycling
- Palmares (quilombo), powerful quilombo located in Brazil and destroyed by Portuguese artillery in 1694
- Palmares River
- Palmares, a 2021 novel by Gayl Jones
- Zumbi dos Palmares International Airport

== See also ==
- Palmar (disambiguation)
