= Dorsal branch =

Dorsal branch may refer to:

- Dorsal branch of ulnar nerve
- Dorsal carpal branch of the radial artery
- Dorsal carpal branch of the ulnar artery
- Dorsal cutaneous branches
