= Las Palmas (disambiguation) =

Las Palmas, most commonly refers to Las Palmas de Gran Canaria, a city in the Canary Islands, Spain.

Las Palmas may also refer to:

== Spain ==
- Province of Las Palmas, a province with the capital city of Las Palmas
- UD Las Palmas, a football team based in Las Palmas
- CV Las Palmas, a volleyball team based in Las Palmas
- Port of Las Palmas (Puerto de Las Palmas), an international sea port based in Las Palmas
- Gran Canaria Airport (Las Palmas Airport), an international airport based in near Las Palmas
- University of Las Palmas de Gran Canaria, a university located in Las Palmas
- Battle of Las Palmas, in 1595 during the Anglo-Spanish War
- Carnival of Las Palmas, a carnival which takes place in Las Palmas
- Las Palmas de Gran Canaria International Film Festival, an international film festival which takes place in Las Palmas
- Las Palmas (Spanish Congress Electoral District)

== Other ==
=== Argentina ===
- Las Palmas, Argentina, a rocket launching site
- Las Palmas, Chaco, a village and municipality in Chaco Province

=== Ecuador ===
- Las Palmas, a beach in Esmeraldas, Ecuador

=== Mexico ===
- Las Palmas complex, an archaeological pattern
- Las Palmas River

=== Panama ===
- Las Palmas District
- Las Palmas, Los Santos
- Las Palmas, Veraguas

=== Peru ===
- Las Palmas Air Base, an airport in Lima
- Las Palmas, a beach in the Asia District, Cañete Province

=== United States ===
- Las Palmas, Fresno, California, neighborhood
- Las Palmas (Santurce), subbarrio of Santurce barrio in San Juan, Puerto Rico
- Las Palmas, Utuado, Puerto Rico, a barrio of Utuado, Puerto Rico
- Las Palmas, Texas, census-designated place in Zapata County
- Las Palmas-Juarez, Texas, a former census-designated place in Cameron County
- Las Palmas II, Texas, current census-designated place in Cameron County
- Las Palmas Handicap, a horse race in Inglewood, California

=== Antarctica ===
- Las Palmas Cove
- Las Palmas Glacier

== Sports teams ==
- Las Palmas de Gran Canaria
  - UD Las Palmas, football team
    - UD Las Palmas Atlético, reserve team of the above
  - Universidad de Las Palmas CF, football team
    - Universidad de Las Palmas CF B, reserve team of the above
  - CV Las Palmas, volleyball team
  - CH Las Palmas, ice hockey team
- Club Atlético Las Palmas, Argentine football team

== See also ==
- La Palma, one of islands of Canary Islands, Spain
- Palma (disambiguation)
- Palmas (disambiguation)
- Isla de Las Palomas
