= Carpal branch of the radial artery =

Carpal branch of the radial artery may refer to:

- Dorsal carpal branch of the radial artery
- Palmar carpal branch of radial artery
