= Corregidora =

Corregidora may refer to:

- Corregidora Municipality, municipality in central Mexico, named for:
- Josefa Ortiz de Domínguez (8 September 1768 – 2 March 1829), frequently referred to as La Corregidora
- Corregidora (novel), a novel by Gayl Jones
- Corregidora (Mexico City Metrobús), a BRT station in Mexico City
- Estadio Corregidora, in Querétaro, Mexico

== See also ==
- Corregidor
