= Dorsal carpal branch of the radial artery =

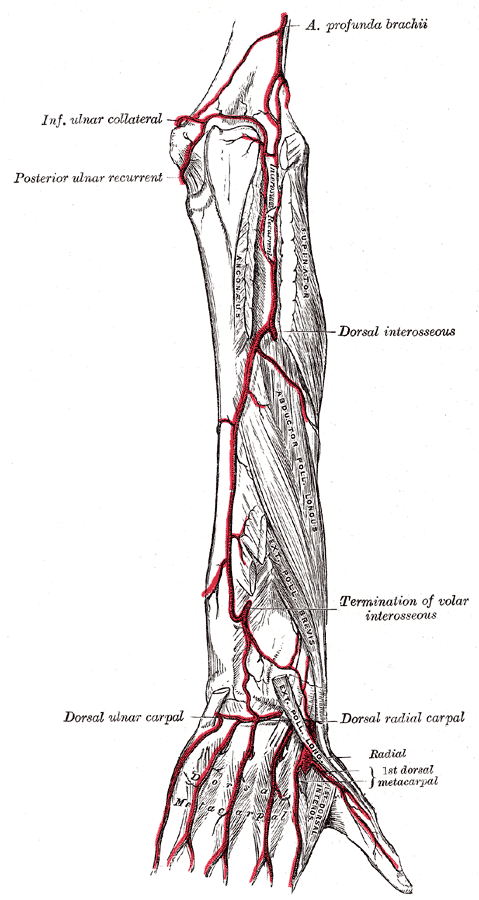
- Arteries of the back of the forearm and hand.

Details
- Source: Radial artery
- Branches: Dorsal carpal arch, dorsalis pollicis, princeps pollicis artery

Identifiers
- Latin: ramus carpalis dorsalis arteriae radialis
- TA98: A12.2.09.032
- TA2: 4646
- FMA: 22755

The dorsal carpal branch of the radial artery (posterior radial carpal artery) is a small vessel which arises beneath the extensor tendons of the thumb; crossing the carpus transversely toward the medial border of the hand, it anastomoses with the dorsal carpal branch of the ulnar artery.

The dorsal branch of the radial artery also branches into the dorsalis pollicis artery; more distally it branches into the princeps pollicis artery, and anastomoses with perforating branches of the deep palmar arch
