= Palmas =

Palmas may refer to:

== Places ==
=== Brazil ===
- Palmas, Tocantins, the capital of the state of Tocantins in Brazil
  - Palmas Airport
- Palmas, Paraná, a centenary small city in the south of the state of Paraná in Brazil
- Das Palmas River, Brazil

=== Elsewhere ===
- Palmas Arborea, a commune in Sicily, Italy
- Palmas, Sardinia, a place on the island of Sardinia, Italy
- Miangas, a small Indonesian island also known as Palmas
  - Island of Palmas Case, a 1928 territorial dispute between the Netherlands and the United States
- Cape Palmas, a headland on the coast of Liberia
- Palmas, Aveyron, a commune in Aveyron department, France
- Palmas, Cataño, Puerto Rico, a barrio in Cataño, Puerto Rico (U.S.)
- Palmas, Guayama, Puerto Rico, a barrio in Guayama, Puerto Rico (U.S.)
- Palmas, Arroyo, Puerto Rico, a barrio in Arroyo, Puerto Rico (U.S.)
- Palmas, Salinas, Puerto Rico, a barrio in Salinas, Puerto Rico (U.S.)

== People ==
- Gérald de Palmas (born 1967), French singer
- Giorgia Palmas (born 1982), Italian television personality and model
- Laurent de Palmas (born 1977), French footballer

== Other uses ==
- Palmas (album), by Eddie Palmieri (1994)
- Palmas (music) hand clapping which is the basis for improvisation in Flamenco
- Banco Palmas, a bank in Brazil
- Palmas Futebol e Regatas, football team in Palmas, Brazil

== See also ==
- Las Palmas (disambiguation)
- Palma (disambiguation)
