= Indicis =

Indicis is a Latin adjective commonly used in anatomical terms pertaining to the index finger, but generally applicable to indexes of any kind.

Examples of the usage include:

- Extensor indicis muscle
- radialis indicis artery
- Moderatio Indicis librorum prohibitorum (Mitigation of the Index Librorum Prohibitorum or List of Prohibited Books)
