= Allen's test =

Medical sign used in physical examination of arterial blood flow to the hands

- Arteries of the hand
- Purpose: examination of arterial blood flow to the hands

In medicine, Allen's test or the Allen test is a medical sign used in physical examination of arterial blood flow to the hands. It was named for Edgar Van Nuys Allen, who described the original version of the test in 1942.

An altered test, first suggested by Irving S Wright in 1952, has almost universally replaced the original method in contemporary medical practice. The alternative method is often referred to as the modified Allen's test or modified Allen test.

== Method ==
=== Original test ===
The original test proposed by Allen is performed as follows:

1. The patient is asked to clench both fists tightly for 1 minute at the same time.
2. Pressure is applied over the radial and ulnar arteries simultaneously so as to occlude them.
3. The patient then opens the fingers of both hands rapidly, and the examiner compares the colour of both. The initial pallor should be replaced quickly by rubor.
4. The test may be repeated, this time occluding the ulnar arteries.

=== Modified test ===
In the modified Allen test, one hand is examined at a time:

1. The patient is asked to clench their fist for about 30 seconds.
2. Pressure is applied over the ulnar and the radial arteries so as to occlude both of them.
3. Still elevated, the hand is then opened. It should appear blanched (pallor may be observed at the finger nails).
4. Ulnar pressure is released while radial pressure is maintained, and the colour should return within 5 to 15 seconds.

If color returns as described, Allen's test is considered to be normal. If color fails to return, the test is considered abnormal and it suggests that the ulnar artery supply to the hand is not sufficient.

== Significance ==
The modified Allen's test is also performed prior to heart bypass surgery. The radial artery is occasionally used as a conduit for bypass surgery, and its patency lasts longer in comparison to the saphenous veins. Prior to heart bypass surgery, the test is performed to assess the suitability of the radial artery to be used as a conduit. A result of less than 3 seconds is considered as good and suitable. A result of between 3–5 seconds is equivocal, whereas the radial artery will not be considered for grafting if the result is longer than 5 seconds.

The utility of the modified Allen's test is questionable, and no direct correlation with reduced ischemic complications of radial artery cannulation have ever been proven. In 1983, Slogoff and colleagues reviewed 1,782 radial artery cannulations and found that 25% of them resulted in complete radial artery occlusion, without apparent adverse effects. A number of reports have been published in which permanent ischemic sequelae occurred even in the presence of a normal Allen's test. In addition, the results of Allen's tests do not appear to correlate with distal blood flow as demonstrated by fluorescein dye injections.

Further modifications to the test have been proposed to improve reliability.
