= Radial artery of index finger =

- Palm of left hand, showing position of skin creases and bones, and surface markings for the volar arches.

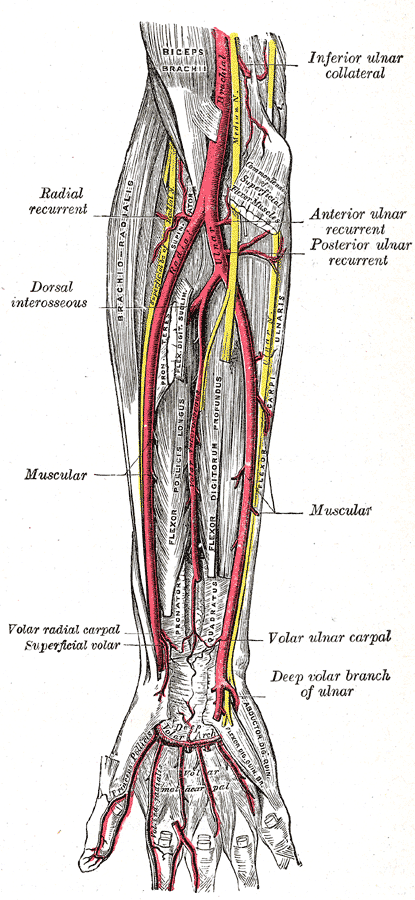
- Ulnar and radial arteries. Deep view. (Vol. ind. radialis labeled at lower left.)

Details
- Source: Deep palmar arch
- Supplies: Index finger

Identifiers
- Latin: arteria radialis indicis
- TA98: A12.2.09.037
- TA2: 4651
- FMA: 22763

The radialis indicis artery (radial artery of index finger) is a branch of the radial artery that provides blood to the index finger.

It arises close to the princeps pollicis artery, and descends between the first dorsal interosseous muscle and the transverse head of the adductor pollicis, and runs along the lateral side of the index finger to its extremity, where it anastomoses with the proper digital artery, supplying the medial side of the finger.

At the lower border of the transverse head of the adductor pollicis, this vessel anastomoses with the princeps pollicis, and gives a communicating branch to the superficial palmar arch.

The princeps pollicis and radialis indicis may arise from a common trunk termed the first palmar metacarpal artery.
