= Edgar Van Nuys Allen =

American doctor and Professor of Medicine at the Mayo Clinic

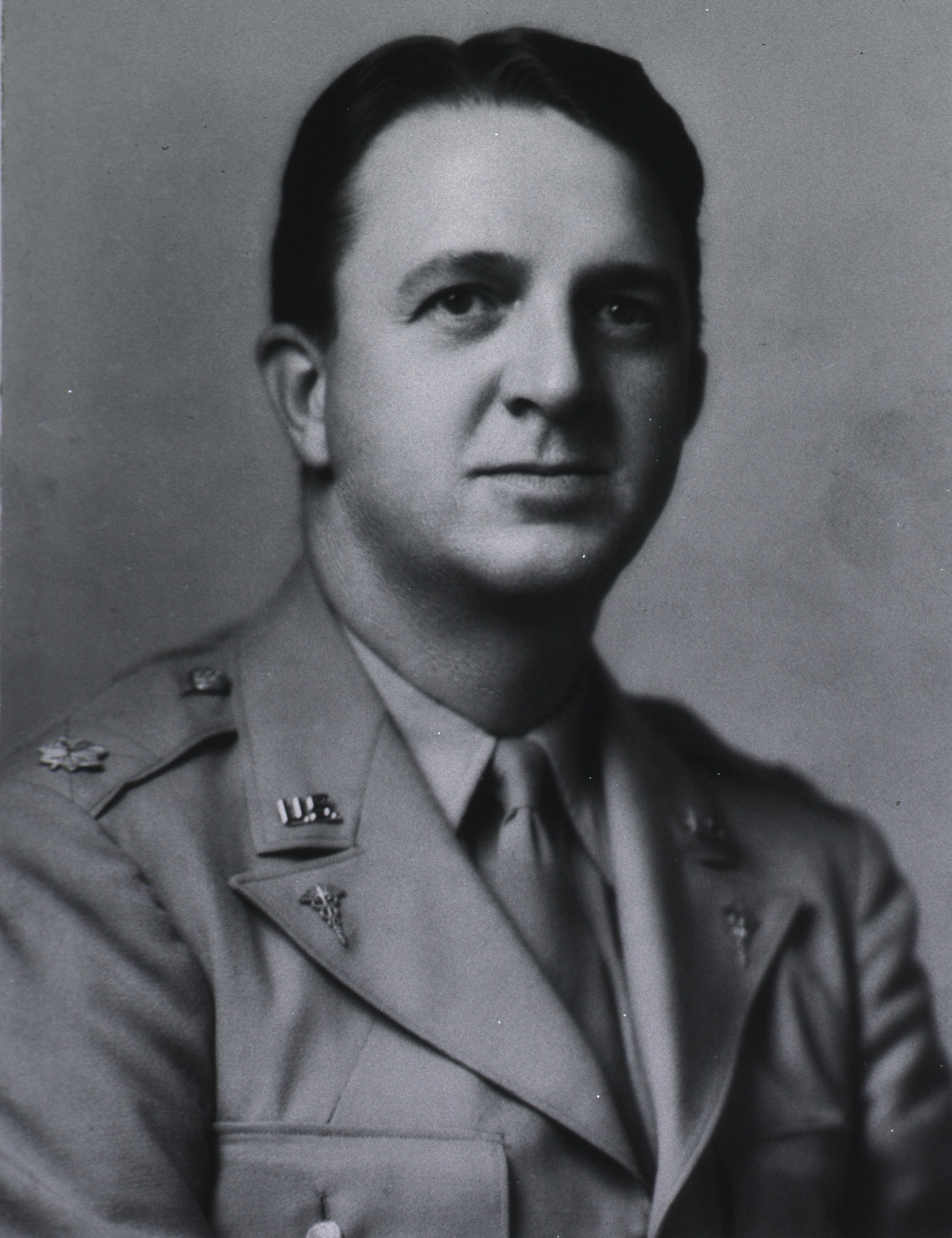
- Edgar Van Nuys Allen in his Lieutenant Colonel uniform.
- Born: June 22, 1900
- Died: June 14, 1961 (aged 60)
- Military career
- Branch: Medical Corps
- Service years: 1942-1946
- Rank: Colonel
- Other work: Cardiologist, Professor

Edgar Van Nuys Allen (June 22, 1900 – June 14, 1961) was an American medical doctor who was a native of Cozad, Nebraska. He is remembered for his contributions as a Professor of Medicine at the Mayo Clinic in Rochester, Minnesota.

Edgar Allen was a specialist in cardiovascular medicine, and particularly known for his research of peripheral vascular disease. His name is lent to the eponymous "Allen test", a procedure used to determine blood supply to the hand. He conducted extensive research and development of dicumarol, an anti-coagulant that is produced from coumarin.

During World War II, he served as an Army officer in the Medical Corps.

== Early life and education ==
Allen was born on June 22, 1900, in Cozad, Nebraska, to Charles Edgar Allen and Sue Morrow. He attended the University of Nebraska and graduated with a Bachelor of Science degree in 1923 and a Masters of Arts degree in 1923.

== Career ==
He began his career at the Mayo Clinic in 1930.

He took a military leave of absence from the Mayo Clinic in 1942. In August 1942, he was commissioned as a lieutenant colonel with the United States Army's Medical Corps. He was promoted to colonel in February 1944. He was appointed to the staff of the Mayo Clinic on June 1, 1930, and became head of a section of medicine less than 6 years later on January 1, 1936.

Many honors came to Dr. Allen during his career. He served as president of the American Heart Association in 1955, as vice president from 1950 to 1951, and as a member of the Board of Directors in 1944. He was awarded the Distinguished Service Medal of the Association in 1957, the Gold Heart Award in 1959, and the Albert Lasker Award in 1960. Two Americans received the Purdue Frederick Medical Achievement Travel Awards in 1958 for “outstanding medical and scientific activities” — Doctors C. Walton Lillehei and Edgar V. Allen. Doctor Allen’s contributions to medical literature totaled nearly 300 papers. His early work led to clinical Studies in the use of dicumarol in postoperative venous thrombosis prophylaxis.

In 1940, Dr. Allen and Dr. Hines published first described the disease lipedema. He was author of the standard Textbook of vascular medicine, Peripheral Vascular Diseases, first published in 1946, and served as a member of the editorial board of the American Heart Journal from 1935 to 1949 and associate editor of Circulation from 1954 to 1960.

In addition to his work at the Mayo clinic, he was on the faculty of the University of Minnesota in Rochester, Minnesota.

== Personal life ==
Allen married Margaret Wise on November 23, 1929. Together, they had three children.

== Selected writings ==
- "Peripheral vascular diseases". Edgar van Nuys Allen along with associates in the Mayo Clinic and Mayo Foundation; 2nd edition, Philadelphia, Saunders, 1955. 825 pages. 3rd edition by Edgar V. Allen, Nelson W. Barker and Edgar A. Hines, Jr. With the assistance of John A. Spittell, Jr. and others. Philadelphia, Saunders, 1962. 1044 pages. 4th edition, Philadelphia, Saunders, 1972. 797 pages. 5th edition 1980, 981 pages.

== Death and legacy ==
He died on June 14, 1961, and was buried in Mankato, Minnesota.
