= Palmar arches =

Palmar arches (or volar arches) may refer to:

- Deep palmar arch
- Superficial palmar arch
- Palmar carpal arch
- Ligamentous palmar arch, which consists of the palmar intercarpal ligaments
