= Volar =

Volar may refer to:

- Volar, Afghanistan, a town in Badakhshan Province
- Volar, Slovenia, a hamlet within the Ljubljana Marsh
- Volar Airlines, later branded as LTE, based in Palma de Mallorca, Spain
- Project VOLAR, or Project Volunteer Army, a US Army post-Vietnam War program
- Volar, an anatomical term referring to the palm side of the hand.
  - Volar interosseous nerve or anterior interosseous nerve, a branch of the median nerve connecting to certain forearm muscles
  - Volar interosseous artery or anterior interosseous artery, an artery in the forearm

== See also ==
- Palmar (disambiguation), an anatomical term sometimes used as a synonym
- A Volar, a song by boy band Menudo
