= Palmar carpal arch =

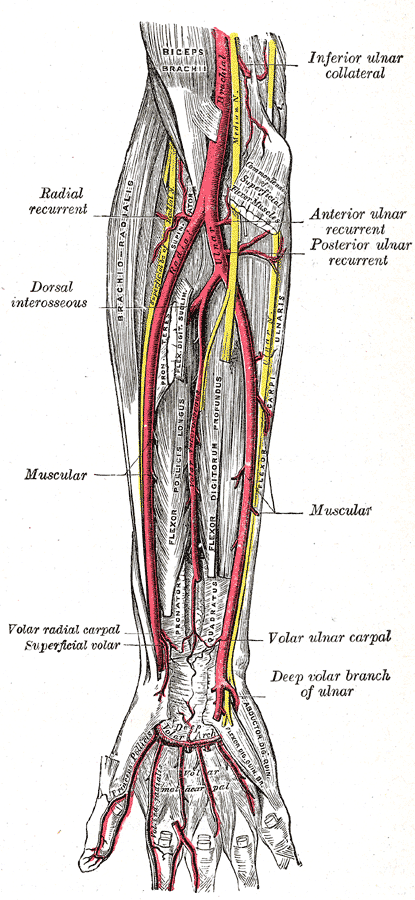
- Deep view of ulnar and radial arteries (palmar carpal arch visible at level of "volar radial carpal" and "volar ulnar carpal", but not labeled)

Details
- Source: Palmar carpal branch of radial artery and palmar carpal branch of ulnar artery

Identifiers
- Latin: rete carpale palmare

The palmar carpal arch is a joining of an artery to an artery, a circulatory anastomosis, known as an arterio-arterial anastomosis. The two connected arteries are the palmar carpal branch of the radial artery and the palmar carpal branch of the ulnar artery.

This anastomosis is joined by a branch from the anterior interosseous artery above, and by recurrent branches from the deep palmar arch below, thus forming a palmar carpal network which supplies the articulations of the wrist and carpus.

== See also ==
- Dorsal carpal arch
- Deep palmar arch
- Superficial palmar arch
