= The Birdcatcher (novel) =

2022 novel by Gayl Jones

- Author: Gayl Jones
- Language: German (1986); English (2022)
- Genre: Historical fiction
- Published: 1986 (orig.); September 13, 2022 (US)
- Publisher: Rowolht (1986); Beacon Press (2022)
- Publication place: Germany (1986); United States (2022)
- Pages: 207 (US 1st ed. hardcover, 2022)
- ISBN: 9780807029947 (US 1st ed. hardcover, 2022)
- OCLC: 1289918818
- Dewey Decimal: 813/.54
- LC Class: PS3560.O483 B57 2022

The Birdcatcher is a 1986 novel by Gayl Jones, originally published as a translated version in Reinbek by Rowolht. It was released in English in September 13, 2022 by Beacon to acclaim. The novel is a finalist for the National Book Award for Fiction.

== Reception ==
The Birdcatcher was generally well received by critics, including starred reviews from Booklist and Publishers Weekly.

Booklist called the novel an "intriguing, tightly crafted, and insightful meditation on creativity and complicated friendships." They further noted that the "prose is captivating, at moments coolly observational and at others profoundly intimate."

Publishers Weekly noted that "Jones, implicitly defiant, draws deeply from classic and global literature" and indicated that the novel "ought to be required reading." They ultimately named The Birdcatcher one of the top ten novels of 2022, regardless of genre.

The Boston Globe wrote that, despite the novel's short length, it "is a brilliant and unsparing examination of the burdens we place on friendship and marriage, the way that creative genius is misperceived as madness, the clumsy way mental health is addressed, the scourge of racism, and the alchemy of folklore and legacy bound in the secrets we hide."

Discussing the novel's structure, The Guardian wrote, "Much of the novel is told in seemingly random spurts of dialogue, where the reader must pick up stray clues and make subtle connections."

Kirkus Reviews provided a mixed review, calling the novel "drolly insinuating" and "predictably unpredictable." They further noted that "shifts in tone and locale make you question almost everything that came before. Whether this was intended or not, its effect seems perfunctory, even abrupt." They concluded, "It may not be the most powerful or best realized of Jones’ novels, but it may be the closest she's come to making us laugh as much as wince."

The Birdcatcher is a finalist for the National Book Award for Fiction.
