= Palma =

Palma or La Palma means palm in a number of languages and may also refer to:

== Geography ==
=== Africa ===
- Palma, Mozambique, town
  - Palma District
- La Palma, one of the Canary Islands, Spain
  - La Palma (DO), a Denominación de Origen for wines from the island of La Palma
  - La Palma Airport
- Gorée, an island in the Bay of Dakar, Senegal

=== The Americas ===
- Palma, Santa Maria, a district of Rio Grande do Sul, Brazil
- Palma, Minas Gerais, a municipality in Brazil
- Palma River, Brazil
- La Palma, Cundinamarca, a municipality and town in Colombia
- La Palma, Cuba, a city
- Río de la Palma, a river in Cuba
- La Palma, Chalatenango, a municipality of El Salvador
- La Palma, Darién, a town of Panama
- La Palma, Los Santos, a corregimiento of Panama
- La Palma, Arizona, an unincorporated place in the United States
- La Palma, California, a city in the United States
  - La Palma Intercommunity Hospital
- Glorieta de la Palma, a roundabout in Mexico City
  - La Palma (Mexico City Metrobús), a BRT station in Mexico City
- Palma Island, a coral island in the Caribbean Sea, governed by Colombia

=== Europe ===
- Palma de Mallorca, Spain
- Palma di Montechiaro
- Bay of Palma, south of Palma, Majorca, Spain
- Palma Arena, Palma, Majorca

== People ==
- Palma (name)
- Dragan Marković (born 1960), Serbian politician and entrepreneur commonly called "Palma"

== Fiction, music and entertainment ==
- Palma, an 1804 opera by Friedrich Witt
- Palma, or Palm, a fictional planet in Phantasy Star and Phantasy Star II
- La Palma (miniseries), a 2024 drama series

== Sport ==
- Palma shooting, a shooting sport, variant of fullbore target rifle
- UB La Palma, a basketball team in Santa Cruz de La Palma, Canary Islands

== Other uses ==
- Battle of Palma, Palma massacre, or Palma shooting, which took place in Mozambique in 2021
- 372 Palma, a main-belt asteroid
- La Palma (newspaper), a Spanish-language newspaper published by The Palm Beach Post in Florida, United States
- Palma School, a Catholic coeducational school in Salinas, California, United States
- 47th Palma Light Infantry Regiment, a military unit of Spain
- Palma, a Spanish name for the marine fish Kyphosus elegans
- Palma ratio, a metric for income distribution

== See also ==
- Las Palmas (disambiguation)
- Palmar (disambiguation)
- Palmas (disambiguation)
- Palam
