= Palmar arteries =

Palmar arteries may refer to:

- Common palmar digital arteries
- Palmar metacarpal arteries
- Proper palmar digital arteries
