= Princeps pollicis artery =

Artery of the human thumb

- Palm of left hand, showing position of skin creases and bones, and surface markings for the volar arches.

Details
- Source: Dorsal carpal branch of radial artery
- Supplies: Thumb

Identifiers
- Latin: arteria princeps pollicis
- TA98: A12.2.09.036
- TA2: 4650
- FMA: 22762

The princeps pollicis artery, or principal artery of the thumb, arises from the radial artery just as it turns medially towards the deep part of the hand; it descends between the first dorsal interosseous muscle and the oblique head of the adductor pollicis, along the medial side of the first metacarpal bone to the base of the proximal phalanx, where it lies beneath the tendon of the flexor pollicis longus muscle and divides into two branches.

These make their appearance between the medial and lateral insertions of the adductor pollicis, and run along the sides of the thumb, forming an arch on the palmar surface of the distal phalanx, from which branches are distributed to the integument and subcutaneous tissue of the thumb.

The princeps pollicis has a particularly strong pulse and can be used for ascertaining one's heart rate. For this reason, the pulse of the thumb is substantially stronger than that of the other digit, and thus it should not be used to read the pulses of others, as it may produce false positives.

== Additional images ==
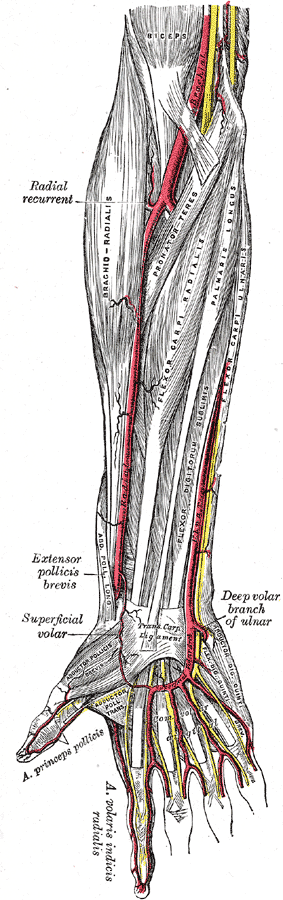
The radial and ulnar arteries. (Arteria princeps pollicis visible at lower left.)

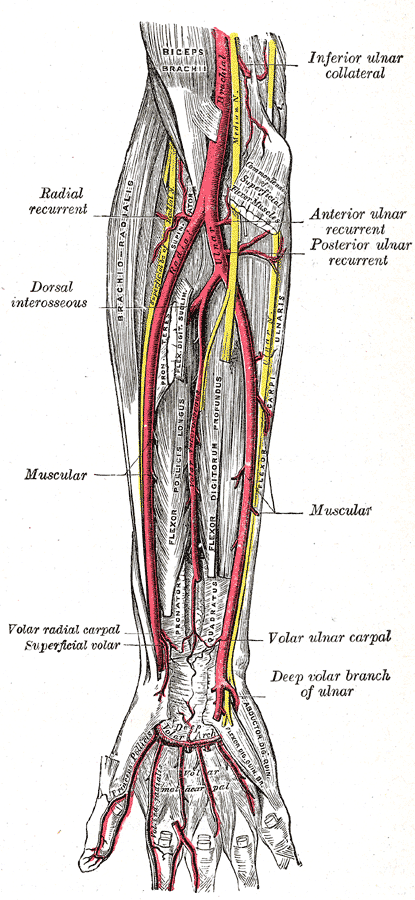
Ulnar and radial arteries. Deep view.
