= Palmares (Jones novel) =

2021 novel by Gayl Jones

- Author: Gayl Jones
- Language: English
- Publisher: Beacon Press
- Publication date: 2021
- Publication place: United States
- Pages: 504
- Awards: Pulitzer Prize (finalist)
- ISBN: 9780807033494

Palmares is a 2021 historical novel by author Gayl Jones, published by Beacon Press. The novel follows Almeyda, who retrospectively tells the story of her life, from growing up as a slave in a plantation in 1670s Brazil to her journey throughout the country to find her missing husband.

The novel was a finalist for the 2022 Pulitzer Prize for Fiction.

== Development ==
The novel was Jones' first work in more than 20 years upon its release in 2021. Jones sent the first draft of the work to her publisher Helene Atwan of Beacon in 1997. By the time Atwan reviewed the work in 1997, it had already been in development for 20 years. Jones continued to develop the novel and it was eventually released in 2021 in its definitive form. In April of 2022, Jones also re-released her book-length poem Song for Anninho (which Beacon had originally released in 1999), but the re-release contained an additional narrative poem, Song for Almeyda, which continues the adventures of Almeyda.

== Narrative ==
The story begins with seven year old Almeyda, then known as Almeydita, who grows up as a slave on a plantation in 1670s Brazil with her stern, stoic mother and eccentric grandmother. While on the plantation, Almeydita meets a free Black woman from Palmares, which is a city that is governed by freed and escaped slaves. Later in her life, Almeyda escapes from the plantation and makes her way to this free city of Palmares where she starts a new life and marries Martim Anninho. She later loses her husband when Palmares is suddenly destroyed in an attack. Almeyda then travels throughout Brazil in a quest to find her husband, meeting a variety of people throughout the way, some free, some enslaved, and others from a warrior or mystical background. Throughout her journey, she is guided by the serpent deity Iararaca and also, briefly guided by the Mystic Luiza Cosme.

== Reception ==
Writing in the New York Times, author Robert Jones Jr. praised the novel as a grand return for Jones, stating: "Mercy, this story shimmers. Shakes. Wails. Moves to rhythms long forgotten. Chants in incantations highly forbidden. It is a story woven with extraordinary complexity, depth and skill; in many ways: holy." Writing for The Guardian, author Yara Rodrigues Fowler praised Jones for deftly exploring unstable social constructs such as gender and race. Fowler also stated: "Palmares reinvents 17th-century Black Brazil in all its multiplicity, beauty, humanity and chaos. It is a once-in-a-lifetime work of literature, the kind that changes your understanding of the world."
