= Las Palmas (Santurce) =

Subbarrio of Santurce in San Juan, Puerto Rico

Coordinates: 18.437°N 66.047°W

- Subbarrio
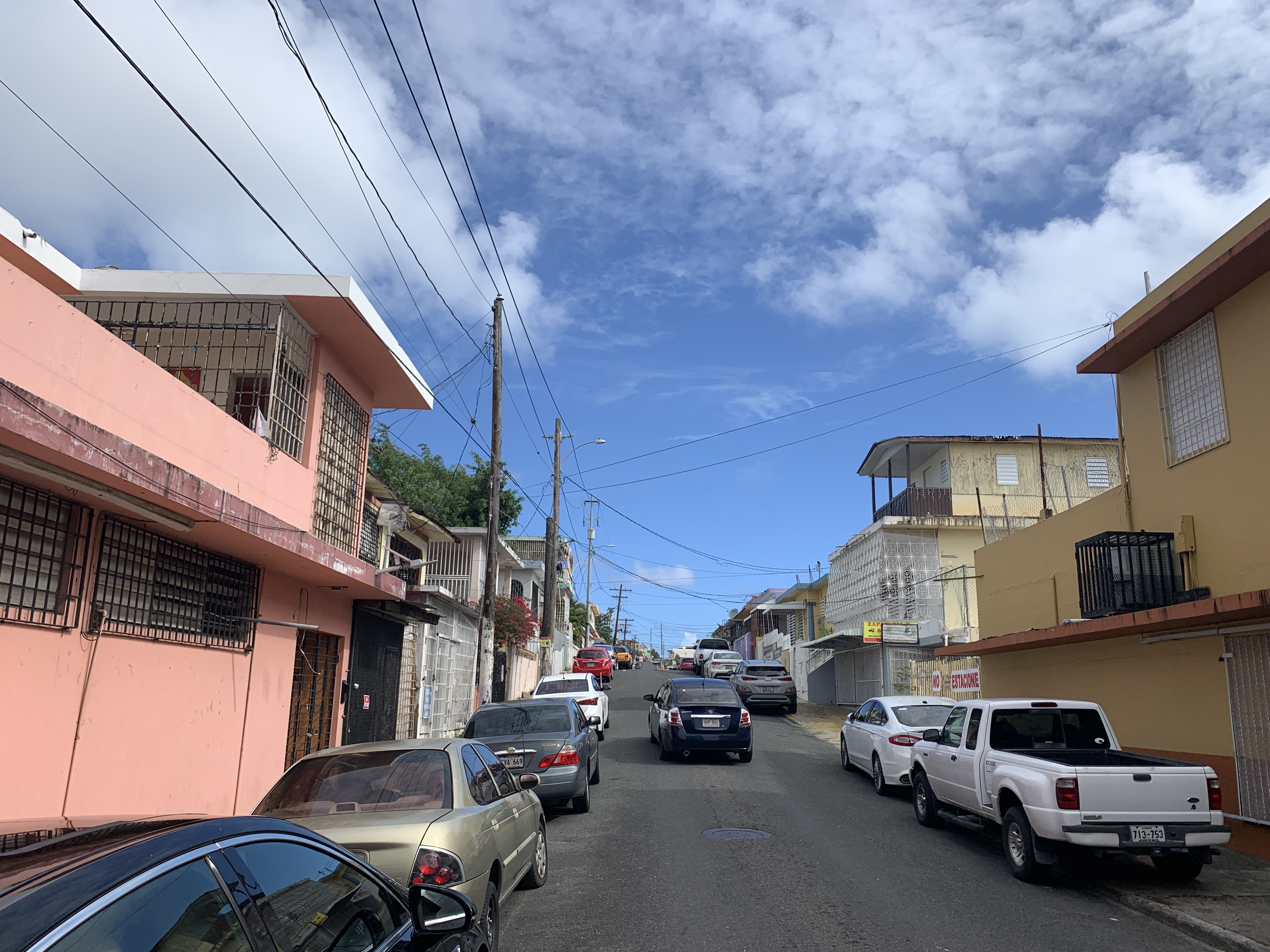

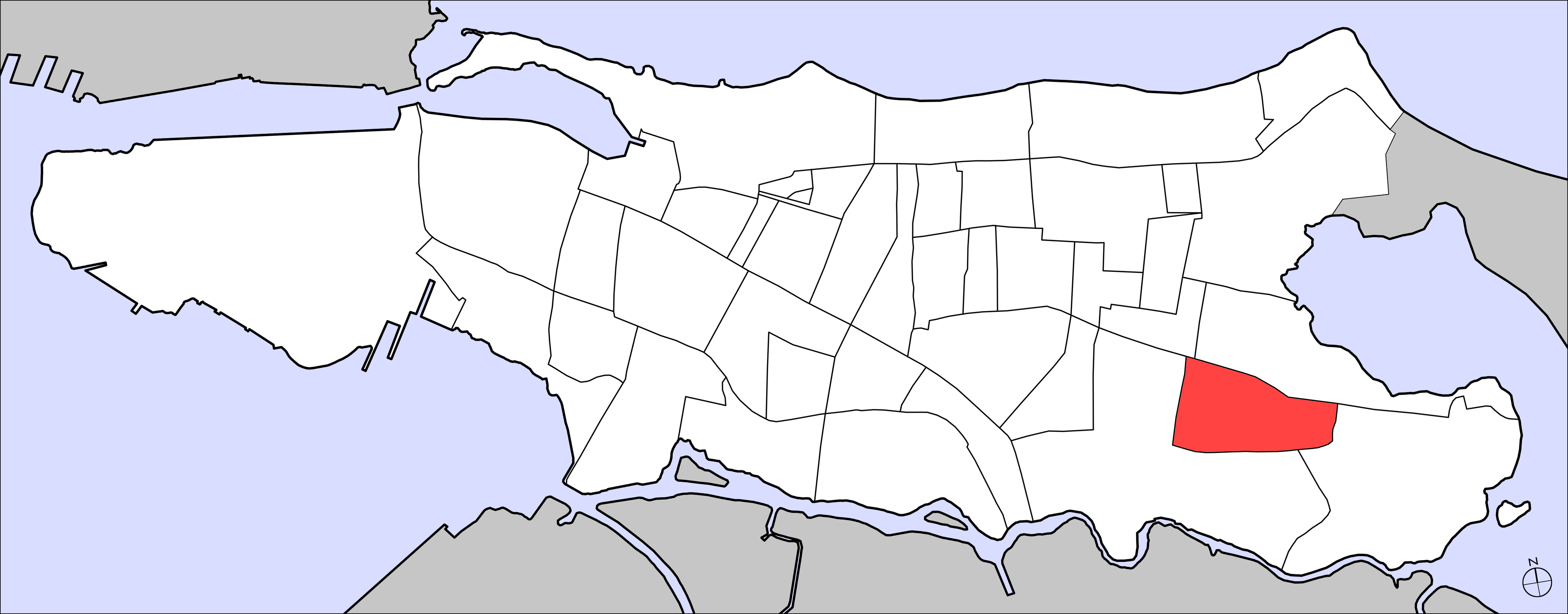
- Commonwealth: Puerto Rico
- Municipality: San Juan
- Barrio: Santurce

Area
  - Total: 0.12 sq mi (0.31 km^{2})
  - Land: 0.12 sq mi (0.31 km^{2})
- Elevation: 43 ft (13 m)

Population (2010)
  - Total: 2,525
  - Density: 21,041.7/sq mi (8,124.2/km^{2})
- Source: 2010 Census
- Time zone: UTC−4 (AST)

Las Palmas is one of the forty subbarrios of Santurce, San Juan, Puerto Rico.

== Demographics ==
In 1940, Las Palmas had a population of 2,691.

In 2000, Las Palmas had a population of 2,772.

In 2010, Las Palmas had a population of 2,525 and a population density of 21,041.7 persons per square mile.

== Description ==
It is home to the Las Casas Public Housing Project.

== See also ==
- List of communities in Puerto Rico
