= Banco Palmas =

Brazilian community bank

Banco Palmas is a Brazilian community bank founded in 1998 in Conjunto Palmeiras, a neighborhood of 32,000 inhabitants located in the suburbs of Fortaleza - Ceará, Brazil operating under the principle of the "Solidarity Socio-Economy."

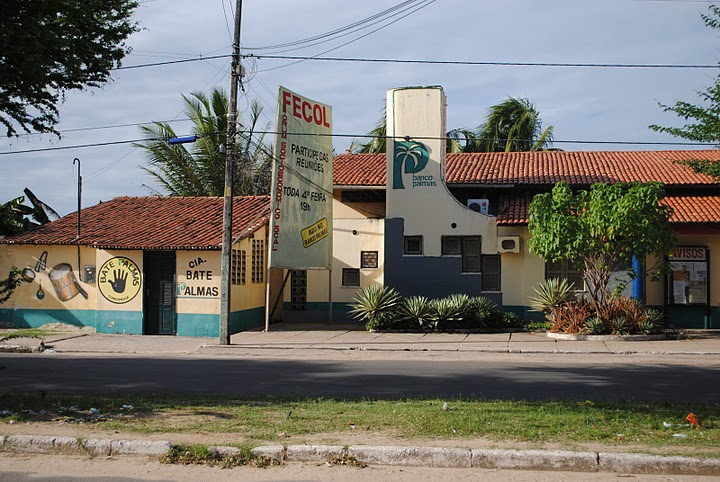
Banco Palmas

It is the first of currently 52 similarly structured community banks - also known as "community development banks" (CDBs) - throughout Brazil. It is managed locally by the Association of Residents of Conjunto Palmeira (Associação dos Moradores do Conjunto Palmeira), known by its acronym ASMOCONP, the staff of which is mostly volunteer. Its mission is to implement programs and projects for work and income generation using solidarity economy systems primarily focused on overcoming urban and rural poverty. Its objective is to ensure micro-credits for local production and consumption with low interest rates and no requirements for registration, proof of income, or guarantor, (the neighbors guarantee the borrower's reliability). Its mission is also to provide access to banking services to residents of poorer communities who generally would not otherwise have access to them in traditional banks, based on lack of credit history or financial collateral and/or physical distance.

== History ==
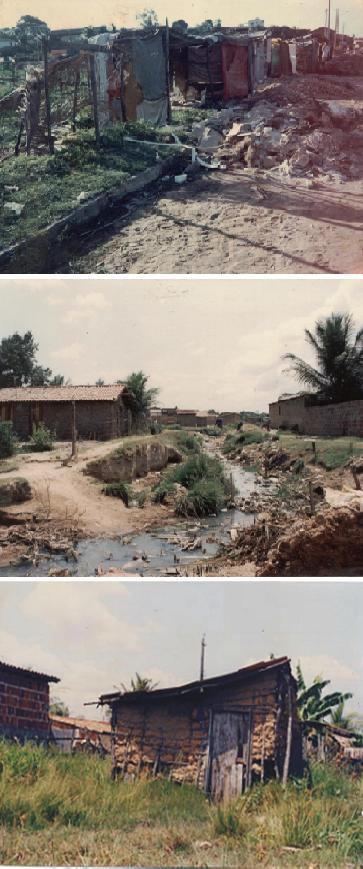
Images of Conjunto Palmeira in the 1970s

The origin of the Palmeira neighborhood dates back to the 1970s. Due to redevelopment initiatives along the coast of the city enacted by the municipal government, fishing communities and other inhabitants were uprooted and forced to move inland. The inland district, known today as Conjunto Palmeira, was devoid of basic infrastructure such as water, roads, and electricity, thereby leaving the neighborhood vulnerable to floods and other natural and economic stability problems. Furthermore, the move inland left the primarily fishing-based community without a stable source of income. In 1981, the residents came together to improve their community, thereby creating ASMOCONP.

In January 1998, ASMOCONP created Banco Palmas as a strategy to face unemployment, creating locally work and income opportunities for residents. As such, Banco Palmas was created as a popular finance tool operating under the principles and values of the solidarity economy.

In 2000, Banco Palmas created the social currency palmas, which circulates in local commerce.

In March 2003, ASMOCONP also established the Instituto Palmas de Desenvolvimento e Socioeconomia Solidária (a.k.a. Instituto Palmas), a non-profit, civil society organization created from the experience of ASMOCONP.

By 2003, the solidarity finances methodology of CDBs was being discussed in several municipalities as an effective instrument in income generation for the poor. One year later, in September 2004, the second CDB opened under the name Banco Par, in the municipality of Paracuru, Ceará, 70 kilometers from Fortaleza.

By 2005, two more banks were established in the state of Espírito Santo – Banco Bem (Municipality of Vitoria) and Banco Terra (Municipality of Vila Velha). By 2008, there were 34 community banks in operation. As of February 2011, there are 52 community banks throughout 12 states in Brazil.

In January 2006, Banco Popular do Brasil became a partner of the Brazilian Network of Community Development Banks as a guarantor of credit lines to the CDBs, through an agreement with the National Secretariat of Solidarity Economy (Secretaria Nacional de Economia Solidaria do MTE). The agreement allowed not only Banco Palmas, but the entire network of community banks to have access to credit and to act as banking correspondents of Banco Popular do Brasil. During that same year, Petrobras decided to support the establishment of new CDBs in two other municipalities; adding up to twelve working CDBs in Brazil by the end of 2006.

Recently, the banks Caixa Econômica Federal (a.k.a. Caixa) and BNDES have become the main financial partners of Banco Palmas - Caixa offering banking correspondent services and limited credit, and BNDES offering credit and institutional development support as of 2011. Zurich Brasil has also played a substantial role in the development of the bank's new line of insurance products, beginning with life insurance (launched in September 2010) and expanding to other programs in the coming years. From 2011, the National Program for Community Banks launched by SENAES - The National Secretary of the Solidarity Economy (Secretaria Nacional de Economia Solidária) will be responsible for the continued growth of the Brazilian Network of Community Banks.

== Theory ==
The main theory behind Banco Palmas, its actions, its achievements, and its history, is that an inherently economically poor territory (be it neighborhood, region, or municipality) does not exist. Territories become poor after repeatedly losing their own savings. Despite the level of poverty of any given territory, it is always capable of achieving economic development. Said development must be autonomous, from within, otherwise, it will not be sustainable.

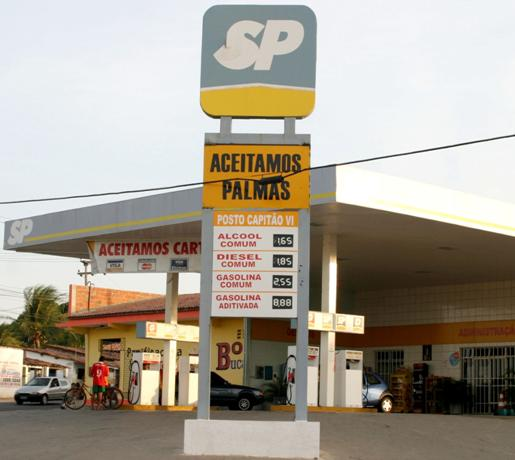
Example of local, neighborhood business which accepts Palmas ("Aceitamos Palmas," meaning "We accept Palmas").

== Local Currency ==
Formally known as "local social circulating currency" or, informally, “local currency” or “social currency” (moeda local or moeda social), is a currency complementary to the real (Brazilian national currency - R$) and created by each community bank. The banks provide small amount loans in real and in the local currency, which circulates only within the neighborhood. (The social currency of Banco Palmas is the “palma,” for example. Each community has its own with its own proper name.) One unit of local currency is equal to one real, and both currencies can be exchanged freely at any time. Incentives for local merchants and consumers exist to use the local currency by providing discounts to users.

The social currency aims to make the "money" circulate in the community, thereby expanding the power of local commerce, increasing circulating wealth in the community, and generating both employment and income. The social currency, therefore, becomes an essential component in the strategies of community banks. Credits can help the economic growth of the district or county by creating new wealth. Local currencies ensure development by promoting that wealth circulates in the community itself.

== Micro-Financial Services ==
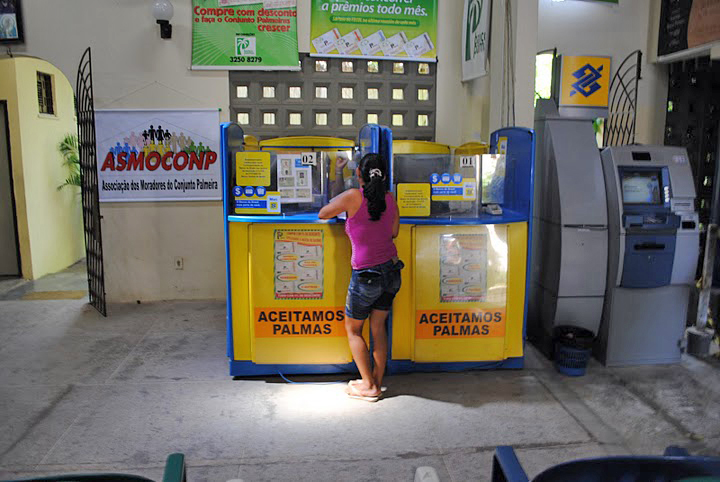
Woman taking out money from the bank

=== Microcredit ===
Microcredits are given to those who normally cannot access "official" sources of funding because of bureaucracy; guarantor, income level, and asset requirements; and other banking regulations.

Forms of Microcredit

1. Credit for Production, Consumption, or Service

For the improvement or creation of both formal and informal small businesses. Based in neighbor guarantees (not monetary or asset guarantees) and with the preliminary approval of a Community Credit Agent (Agente Comunitário de Crédito), the loan must be presented to the Credit Committee which ultimately evaluates and approves the loans, made in amounts of up to R$15,000.00 in up to 12 payments. Interest rates are progressive and range from 0.5% to 3.5% monthly.

2. Credit for Productive Inclusion

“Instant credit” allowing the creditor to benefit from the day-to-day opportunities the community market has to offer. Aimed toward families receiving government assistance through the Bolsa Familia Program (up to R$150), beauty product vendors (up to R$400), and street vendors people (up to R$200), loans are re-paid in up to four payments and interest rates range between 1.5% and 2.5% monthly. Credit recipients must present proof of trade or craft and justify the purpose of credit. On average 160 microloans are issued in Banco Palmas alone.

3. “Casa Produtiva”

Instant credit for the purpose of home renovation, with the objective to create or improve an income generating enterprise. The maximum value of the loans is R$450, re-paid in up to six payments with an interest rate of 2.5% monthly.

4. Credit for Local Consumption

Disbursed in social currency palmas in the maximum amount of R$600 payable in up to four payments with no interest. Local businesses offer discounts (5-10% off) for those who buy using the social currency. In 2010, 240 businesses in Conjuno Palmeira were accepting the social currency, offering discounts to those buying with it. The palmas is indexed to the real, is backed by the official country currency, and the exchange between the two currencies is legally permitted. As of 2010, 42,000 palmas were circulating in the neighborhood.

=== Microinsurance ===
“Palmas Microseguro” was launched in September 2010. It is a microinsurance policy for low income, Banco Palmas clients. At an annual cost of R$27.30, it offers up to R$3,000 life insurance policies (accidental or natural death), funeral cost coverage up to R$1,000, and a R$5,000 lottery every month for one year to clients. Those who buy more than three policies are allowed to pay in as much as six payments per year, (there is a special loan directed at these cases). On average 130 policies are sold per month.

=== Banking Correspondent ===
Banco Palmas has a strong role as a banking correspondent, helping the community to locally make and receive payments such as bolsa familia and pension benefits, open checking and savings accounts, as well as other banking services. This role is an important one for community banks in general because it allows basic banking access to communities who may be located very far from traditional banks, thereby making commuting difficult or impossible for elderly or disabled residents. On average 17,000 transactions per month are executed.

== Instituto Palmas ==
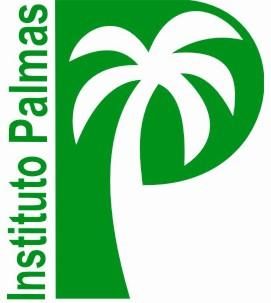
Instituto Palmas

In March 2003, ASMOCONP also established the Instituto Palmas de Desenvolvimento e Socioeconomia Solidária (a.k.a. Instituto Palmas), a non-profit, civil society organization created from the experience of ASMOCONP in order to:

- Negotiate new and manage existing financial partnerships
- Assist in the implementation of community banks in other communities
- Gather data about the people and operations throughout the network
- Release official publications about the community bank experience in Brazil
- Provide staff and community trainings throughout the network
- Develop new and manage existing financial products

Legally, Instituto Palmas functions as a Civil Society Organization of Public Interest (OSCIP) of Micro-credit. It acts as an umbrella organization by managing the network and providing legal support to all community banks, many of which are just “local associations” with no institutional structure. As an OSCIP, Instituto Palmas can establish partnerships with the public sector and official banks, thereby generating resources and technologies for the benefit of the community banks that are part of the network.

== Legal Framework ==
From a legal standpoint, Banco Palmas (and a majority of the Community Banks) work under the protection of the legal framework of Instituto Palmas. Instituto Palmas is a Civil Society Organization of Public Interest (OSCIP) of Microcredit.

Cooperation with the Central Bank has grown in the last four years, culminating in November 2009 with the announcement of a new partnership between Banco Palmas and the Central Bureau of Solidarity Economy/ Federal Minister of Work (Secretaria Nacional de Economia Solidáriao-SENAES/Ministério do Trabalho do Governo Federal) to create an official bill for the social currencies, thereby creating a sort of “official position” of the Brazilian government on local circulating monies. The process is ongoing, but the relationship with the Central Bank and the Brazilian Network of Community Banks in regard to the use of the social currency has been significantly positive.

== The Brazilian Network of Community Banks ==
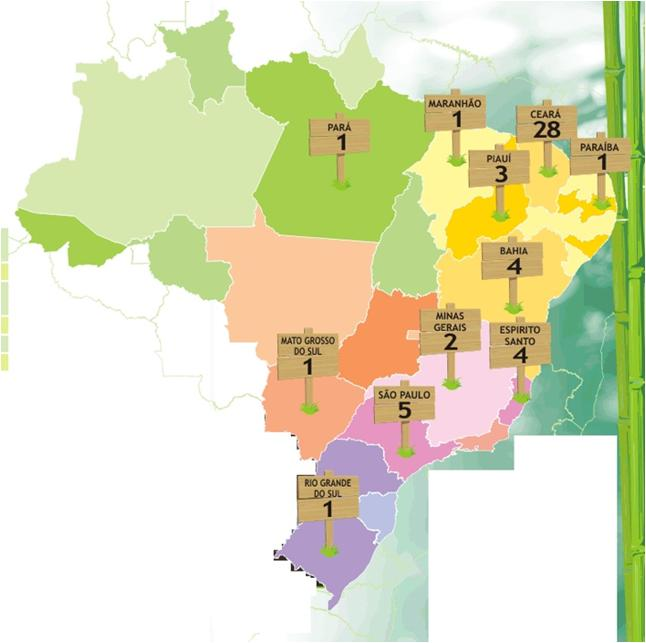
A map of the community banks in Brazil as of 2010

Banco Palmas belongs to the Brazilian Network of Community Banks (see below), The Ceará Network of the Solidarity Socio-Economy (a Rede Cearense de Socioeconomia Solidária - RCSES), and the Brazilian Forum of Solidary Economy (o Fórum Brasileiro de Economia Solidária - FBES).

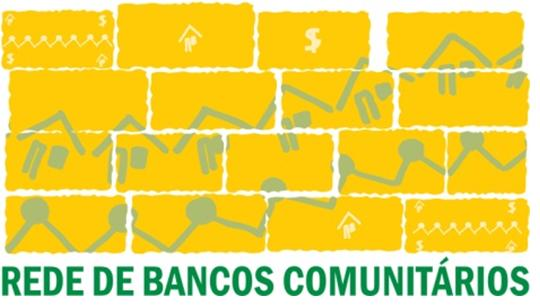
Logo of the Brazilian Network of Community Banks

The Brazilian Network of Community Banks currently includes 52 banks (as of March 2011) throughout Brazil, each created with the experience and support of Banco Palmas. A community bank is not a branch of a central bank, rather part of a network, following reference and common work methods defined by the Brazilian Network of Community Banks. The following is some basic information about community development banks:

What are Community Development Banks?

Community Development Banks provide solidarity finances services in a network of associative and communitarian nature, directed towards the generation of jobs and income, having at its base the principles of the solidarity economy.

What are the main characteristics of the Community Development Banks?

1. The community itself decides to create the bank, becoming its manager and proprietor;
2. It always acts with two credit lines: one in Real currency (R$) and another one in circulating social currency;
3. Its credit lines stimulate the creation of local production and consumption networks, promoting the auto-development of the area;
4. It supports enterprises as a commercialization strategy (solidarity shops, fairs, central office for commercialization etc.);
5. It acts in areas characterized by a high degree of exclusion and social inequality;
6. It is aimed at a public characterized by a high degree of social vulnerability, in particular the beneficiaries of governmental programs;
7. It aims to become financially sustainable in the short term, obtaining subsidies justified by their social utility.

What is the objective of a Community Development Bank?

To promote the development of low income areas through the encouragement and creation of local production and consumption networks. It operates with the support of the economic initiatives of the solidarity economy and its diverse scope, such as socio-productive enterprises, service providers, support for socio-commercial initiatives (markets, solidarity fairs), and consumer organizations.

What is the management structure of the Community Development Bank?

CDBs are managed from within the structure of the community organizations (associations, councils, forums etc.) and other types of civil society initiatives that are recognized within the community, such as unions, NGOs, and churches. Its management involves a shared dimension with strong components of local social control, based on the mechanisms of direct democracy.

How do you finance Community Development Banks?

Its financing is done through access to public resources as well as a solidarity fund for community investment. This fund is formed from multiple sources: private, personal donations or those from legal entities; membership fees (from private or legal entities); commercial services provided that face no competition; and other types of services provided.

Who are the main potential customers of Community Development Banks?

Because of its condition as a citizen's initiative focused on the development of the area, CDBs are aimed at a public characterized by a high degree of social vulnerability in particular, including (but not limited to) women, youth, merchants, new entrepreneurs, etc.

What is the capacity of Community Development Banks?

To allow the methodology to work properly, CDBs operate primarily in communities of up to 50,000 inhabitants. It is possible to have more than one functioning CDB in the same community or neighborhood.

== Social Projects ==
=== Bairro Escola de Trabalho ("Neighborhood Work School") ===
Bairro Escola de Trabalho is a project of practical training, employment and income generation for youth aged 16 to 24 years old in which neighborhood businesses (commercial, service, etc.) train and employ young people in the community. More than 1,000 youth in the neighborhood and surrounding areas had participated within the first three years of the Program's implementation.

The objective of the Project is aimed toward the development of the district by involving youth living in social exclusion. It is believed that community-strengthening actions such as these have reduced rates of violence among young people from the moment they find themselves valued and integrated into the social and economic life of the community which is simultaneously responsible for the well-being of the region where they live.

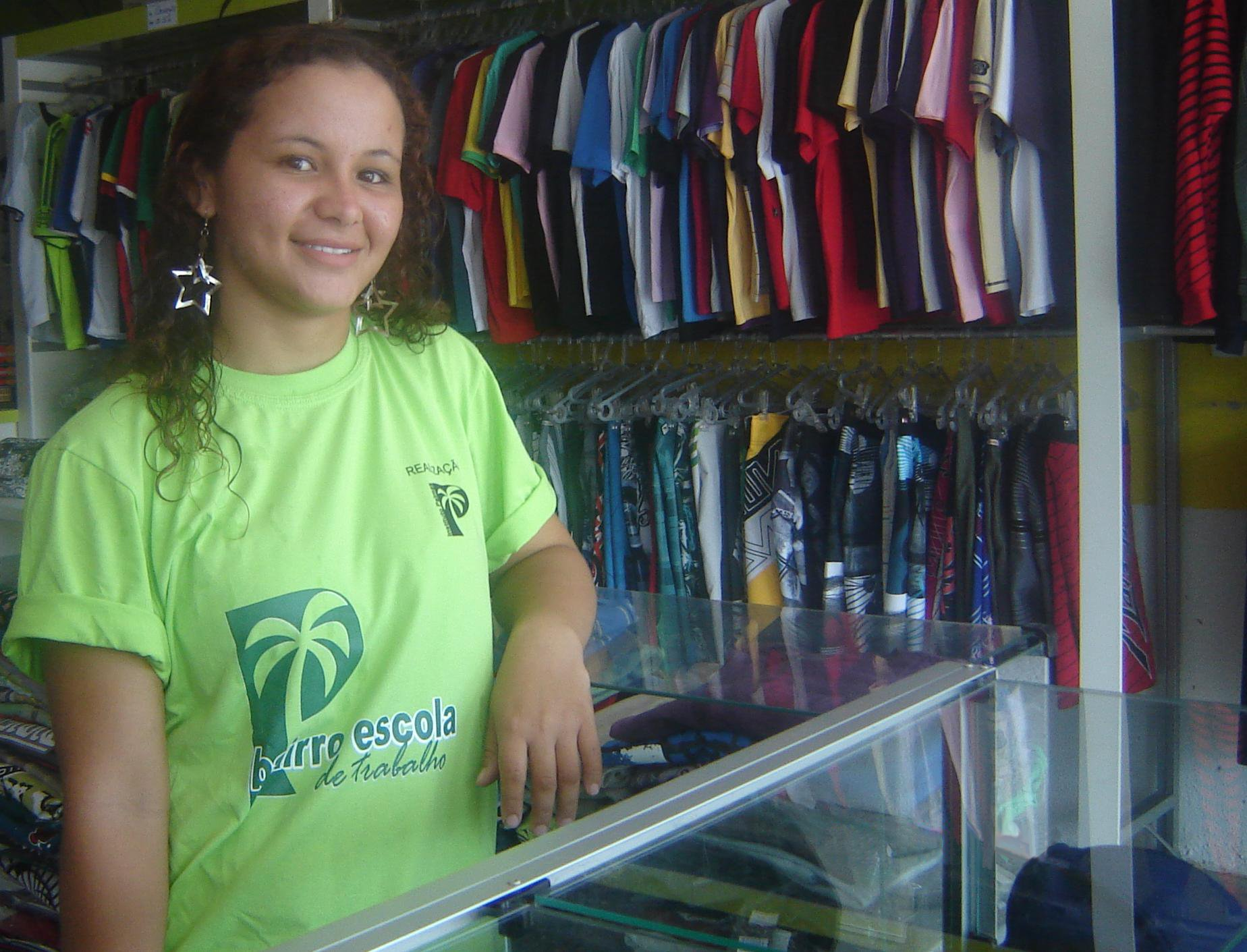
A Bairro Escola student gaining work experience in a neighborhood commercial shop.

Innovative Aspects of the Project:

- Provides a wide range of vocational courses for young people;
- The training is customized: Each business can receive, at maximum, two trainees at a time;
- Increases the chances of post-course employment as the students are trained according to the specific needs and characteristics of the enterprises;
- The process of professional training is both an opportunity for meeting and integration among the various segments of the community;
- Stipends allocated to each student, thereby reducing training costs for the student and enabling the service to reach a greater number of young people.

Project Components:

1. TRAINING/INTERNSHIP - Professional training for students in businesses known as “training enterprises.”
2. FINANCING - microcredit line up to R$3,000 granted by Banco Palmas, in partnership with Banco Popular do Brazil, to expand the “training enterprises,” and another credit line of up to R$15,000 for the incubation of new businesses for students who wish to start a collective productive enterprise.
3. INCUBATOR - New collective business incubators created by students developing new links in supply chains.

=== Incubadora Feminina ("Women Incubator") ===
Incubadora Feminina was created by Instituto Palmas in 2001 aimed at women living in the neighborhoods and surrounding areas. The strategy is to integrate these women into the labor market, or have them support themselves by creating self-managerial enterprises to provide them with their own income. As of 2010, Incubadora Feminina had trained 165 women, with a labor market-integration success rate of 60%. Each class defines a vocational focus including 12 months of training with a total average of 940 hours per activity.

=== Bate Palmas Company ===
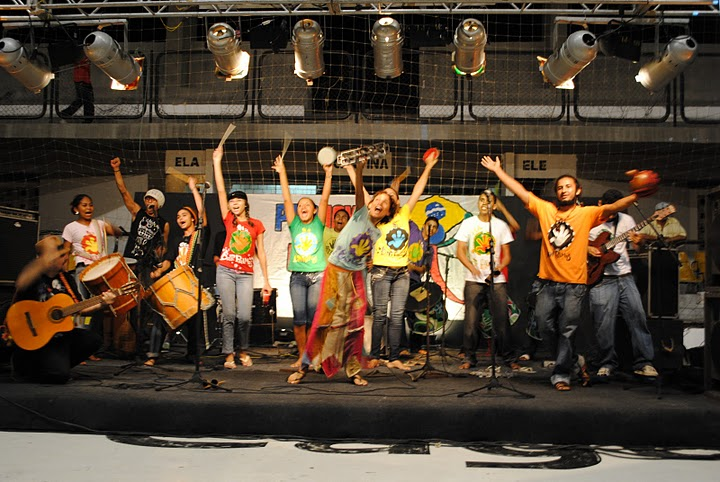
The Bate Palmas Company taking their bows after a performance.

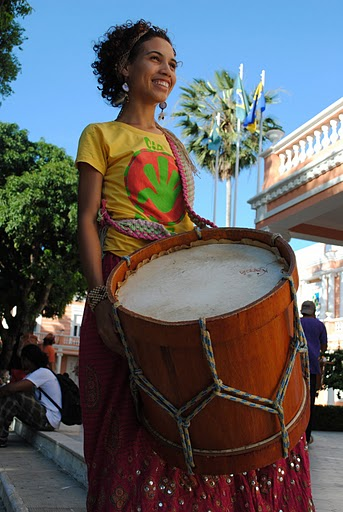
Member of the Bate Palmas Company

Bate Palmas is a musical youth group from Conjunto Palmeiras under the coordination of the singer-songwriter Parahyba and support of the Banco Palmas. Through its music, the Bate Palmas Company represents the culture and the history of the neighborhood while also representing the principles of the solidarity economy movement through the manufacturing and selling of its own artistic and cultural products, including musical instruments, CD recordings, art workshops, and shows and other artistic performances. Although with great emphasis on percussion, the band is, at times, also accompanied by guitar, electric bass, drums, mandolin, violin, guitar and vocals. The result is always a show full of rhythms with the influence of various types of music such as Coco, Frevo, Bumba-Meu-Boi, Maracatu, Ciranda, Rap, Going, Carimbó, Rock, Reggae, Samba, Baião and others. Bate Palmas performs nationally and takes places in collaboration activities ranging from various group workshops within the State to joint events and presentations with local groups.

=== Community Consultants Course ===
The Community Consultants Course is a program of approximately 400 hours sponsored by Institute Palmas aimed at empowering youth in the community by teaching them how to offer consulting services to small businesses in the neighborhood, including advising about access to credit, use of social circulating currency, opportunities such as trade fairs and community solidarity shops, promoting local products, participation in the solidarity economy network, pricing, marketing, inventory, and more. Besides the practical lessons of the course, it is also directed at actions which work to strengthen the Network of the Solidarity Economy. It also serves as a training program for prospective employees and volunteers of Banco Palmas. Many bank employees have come to work at the Bank through this program.

=== Academia de Moda Periferia ("Academy of Periphery Fashion") ===
Academy of Periphery Fashion is a fashion production training program for women and youth in the outskirts of the Fortaleza Metropolitan Region. The aim of the Academy of Fashion is to improve the technical and professional skills of women and youth in the outskirts of the city through social inclusion based on principles of the solidarity economy.

Innovative Aspects:

- Targeted towards at risk women and youth, handicapped, indigenous and minority peoples;
- Provides a wide range of vocational courses in the area of fashion and fashion equipment/technology;
- Quality technical and professional fashion training opportunities in the periphery;
- Participation and community involvement in the process of marketing pieces, thereby maximizing local revenue.

Components of the Academy of Fashion:

1) Training/Internship

* Local lectures and laboratory practice with qualified teachers and students in their final year of fashion design of the Federal University of Ceará and Marista College. Students also may undertake internships in project partner companies.
* Workshops on networks of solidarity economics, business management, entrepreneurship, partnership, and leadership training.

2) Funding

* Grant credit for those who want to create, individually or collectively, their own business related to the fashion world.

3) Incubation

* Provided technical assistance to new businesses that allow training for groups of women and girls in the fashion world.

4) Commercialization

* Points of sales (shops, markets, fairs) to market the pieces produced by students during training and after creating their own ventures.

=== PalmaTech ===
PalmaTech is a space which offers various workshops and courses in the area of professional training, business management solidarity, networking and tools for the solidarity economy emphasizing the culture of cooperation. The school is responsible for managing general knowledge about Banco Palmas, including developing teaching materials, publications, and reports. Its central value is societal control over the economy and the market as an area of cooperation, collaboration, and satisfaction of human needs.

=== Escola Popular Cooperativa Palmas ===
"The People’s School of the Palmas Cooperative" - Palmas EPC - is a project of Instituto Palmas dedicated to encouraging neighborhood youth pursue higher education. It offers students theoretical knowledge to pass the college entrance exam, development of entrepreneurial skills, and general awareness of participation in community activities and environmental protection. Each class has six months of training, including 600 hours of classroom work. Teachers are usually former students, university students, and teachers of public schools in the district.

=== 1,000 Youth, 10 Ideas ===
1,000 Youth, 10 Ideas (1,000 Jovens, 10 Idéias) is an annual event that collects 1,000 of the neighborhood's youth to brainstorm ways in which they think the community can and should be improved. Of these ideas, 10 are chosen to implement in the following year. In June 2009, the community started having discussions about violence in the neighborhood, both regarding the police approach towards this problem, as well as the obvious correlation between drug use and crime. In addition, the community members recognized that the neighborhood lacked cinemas, theaters, sports fields, clubs, and any other spaces of entertainment for community used. From that discussion came the idea of creating an annual forum in which the youth could think of ideas to improve their community and, consequentially, realize them. The theme of the first year of 2009 was aimed at ways to make the neighborhood more enjoyable. The ten ideas on which the community ultimately decided were helped to be made possible by the State Government of Ceará. In 2010, the theme was “1,000 Youth, 10 Ideas to Include My Neighborhood in the 2014 World Cup.” Since the introduction of the program, Conjunto Palmeira has realized several important ideas from the community. Squares were remodeled, walls have been restored and decorated, training courses were planned and executed, and an art space for young people was created, “Palmeira das Artes.”

== Social Businesses ==
Small, formal or informal, businesses funded by Banco Palmas targeted to meet local demands. The projects are independent and interconnected through a solidarity network. They use the logo and performance structures of Banco Palmas.

=== PalmaTur ===
PalmaTur is an inn under the solidarity network of Banco Palmas which promotes alternative, urban community tourism. It was initially created by 20 neighborhood women trained by Instituto Palmas's Incubadora Feminina program to provide services in tourism and retail. Through 12 months of training with a total of 940 hours / activity, PalmaTur emerged. The idea behind PalmaTur is that there exists a Fortaleza beyond the Beira mar; the outskirts of the city too have many features worthwhile for tourists and new residents alike. The wealth from such an enterprise can be shared in a sustainable way, giving back even more to the community. The primary objectives of PalmaTur are to:

1. Promote Conjunto Palmeira as an alternative tourist destination in Fortaleza, strengthening the local economic development and having as a base the principles of sustainability and solidarity.
2. Guarantee work and income for the women of the neighborhood by including them in the formal labor pool.

=== Palma Fashion ===
Palma Fashion is a program created to give women suffering from drug addiction, domestic violence, and other setback the chance to learn various skills in the art of fashion in order to give them the opportunity to be their own, productive members of their society. Palma Fashion produces a diverse collection of clothing, handbags, shoes and more.

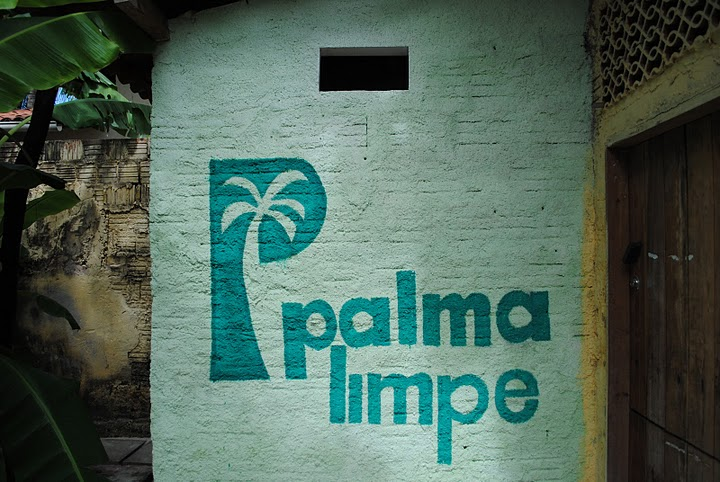
Palma Limpe

=== Palma Limpe ===
PalmaLimpe produces cleaning materials: detergent, disinfectant, bleach, fabric softener and liquid wax, and is composed of youth from the community. Training for this enterprise is provided by the municipal government and additional resources are provided by Banco Palmas.

=== Loja Solidária ("Solidarity Shop") ===
The Loja Solidária operates out of Banco Palmas headquarters and exhibits and sells products manufactured in the neighborhood. Products are also sold at the Banco Palmas Market (Feira do Banco Palmas), a weekly public space where products made in the neighborhood are sold. It serves as an instrument to reinforce the community culture, allowing opportunities for the presentation of artists, singers, and other performers of local culture as well. The social currency is accepted at both venues.

=== PalmaNatus ===
PalmaNatus was created in 2005 and works with handmade soaps and herbal products such as syrup, rosemary, and pepper.

== FECOL ==
The Local Social Economic Forum (O Fórum Socioeconômico Local – FECOL) is a public space for the Conjunto Palmeira community to discuss their voices related to the socioeconomic and cultural issues of the neighborhood and surrounding areas with the underlying purpose to promote the endogenous development of the area.

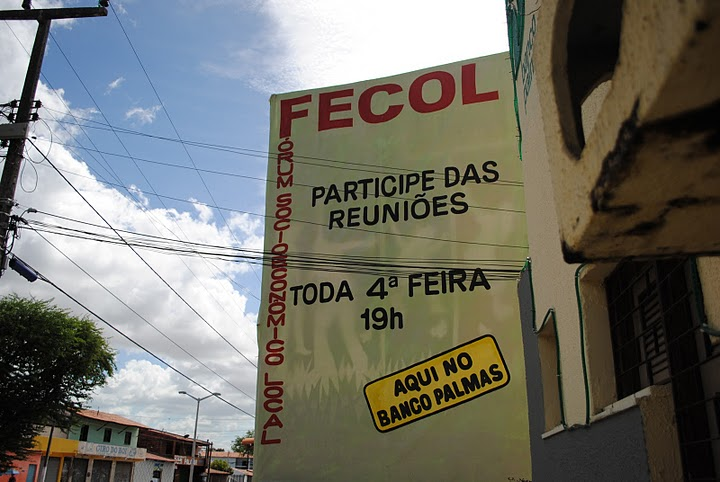
FECOL

Among the several decisions made by FECOL in 2010, some of the most important were:

- Realizing the "Inverse Rally” (Comício Inverso) - an event held during local election season when mayoral and council member candidates listened to people of the community speak. During the event, the candidates listened while the neighborhood reported their problems and requested solutions. After the interviews, the candidates received the "Platform of the Conjunto," a document including a list of the neighborhood's major problems along with accompanying solutions.
- Prioritization of two goals for the next two years:

1) land use regulation for all homes in the neighborhood, and
2) deployment of a conventional sewer system to replace the current, saturated system.

FECOL meets every Wednesday at 7 p.m. at Banco Palmas.
