= Palmar carpal branch of radial artery =

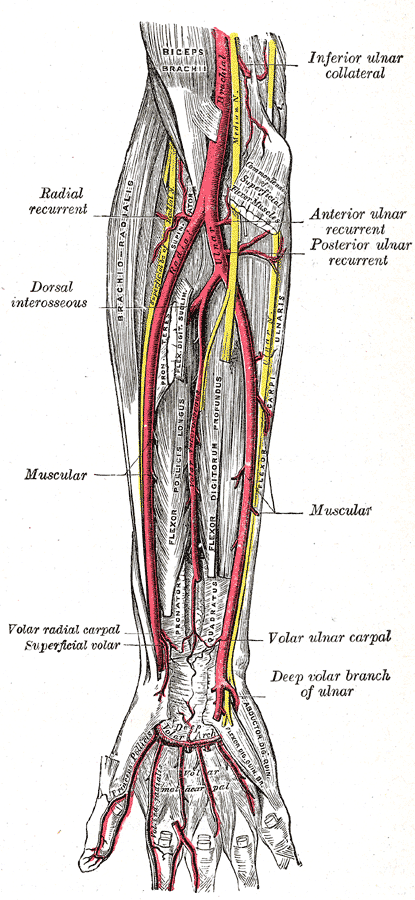
- Ulnar and radial arteries. Deep view. (Palmar carpal branch of radial artery labeled as "volar radial carpal", at lower left.)

Details
- Source: Radial artery
- Branches: Palmar carpal arch

Identifiers
- Latin: ramus carpalis palmaris arteriae radialis
- TA98: A12.2.09.030
- TA2: 4644
- FMA: 22750

The palmar carpal branch of the radial artery is a small branch of the radial artery which arises near the lower border of the pronator quadratus, and, running across the front of the carpus, anastomoses with the palmar carpal branch of the ulnar artery.
