= Las Palmas, Fresno, California =

- District of Fresno, California; Former Unincorporated community
- Location in California
- Coordinates: 36°45′27″N 119°42′02″W
- Country: United States
- State: California
- County: Fresno County
- City: Fresno
- Elevation: 331 ft (101 m)

Las Palmas (Spanish for "The Palms") is a former unincorporated community in Fresno County, California, now incorporated in Fresno. It lies at an elevation of 331 feet (101 m).
