= Radial artery =

Large forearm artery

- Palm of left hand, showing position of skin creases and bones, and surface markings for the volar arches.

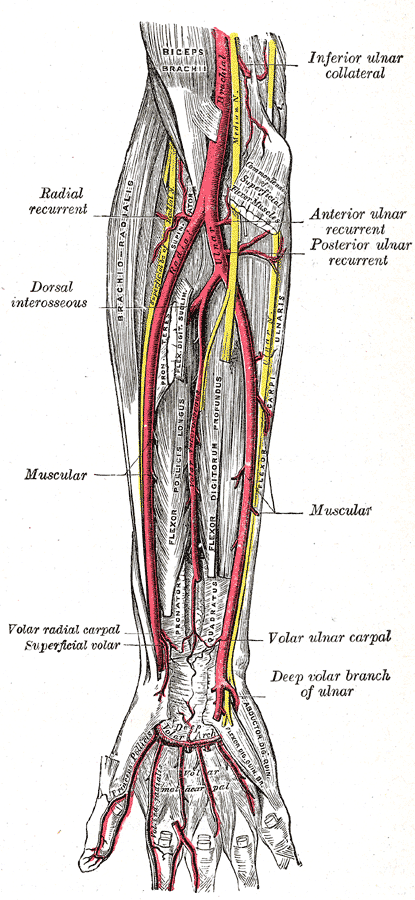
- Ulnar and radial arteries. Deep view.

Details
- Source: Brachial artery
- Branches: In the forearm: Radial recurrent artery Palmar carpal branch of radial artery Superficial palmar branch of the radial artery. *At the wrist: Dorsal carpal branch of radial artery First dorsal metacarpal artery. *In the hand: Princeps pollicis artery Radialis indicis Deep palmar arch
- Vein: Radial vein

Identifiers
- Latin: arteria radialis
- MeSH: D017534
- TA98: A12.2.09.027
- TA2: 4641
- FMA: 22730

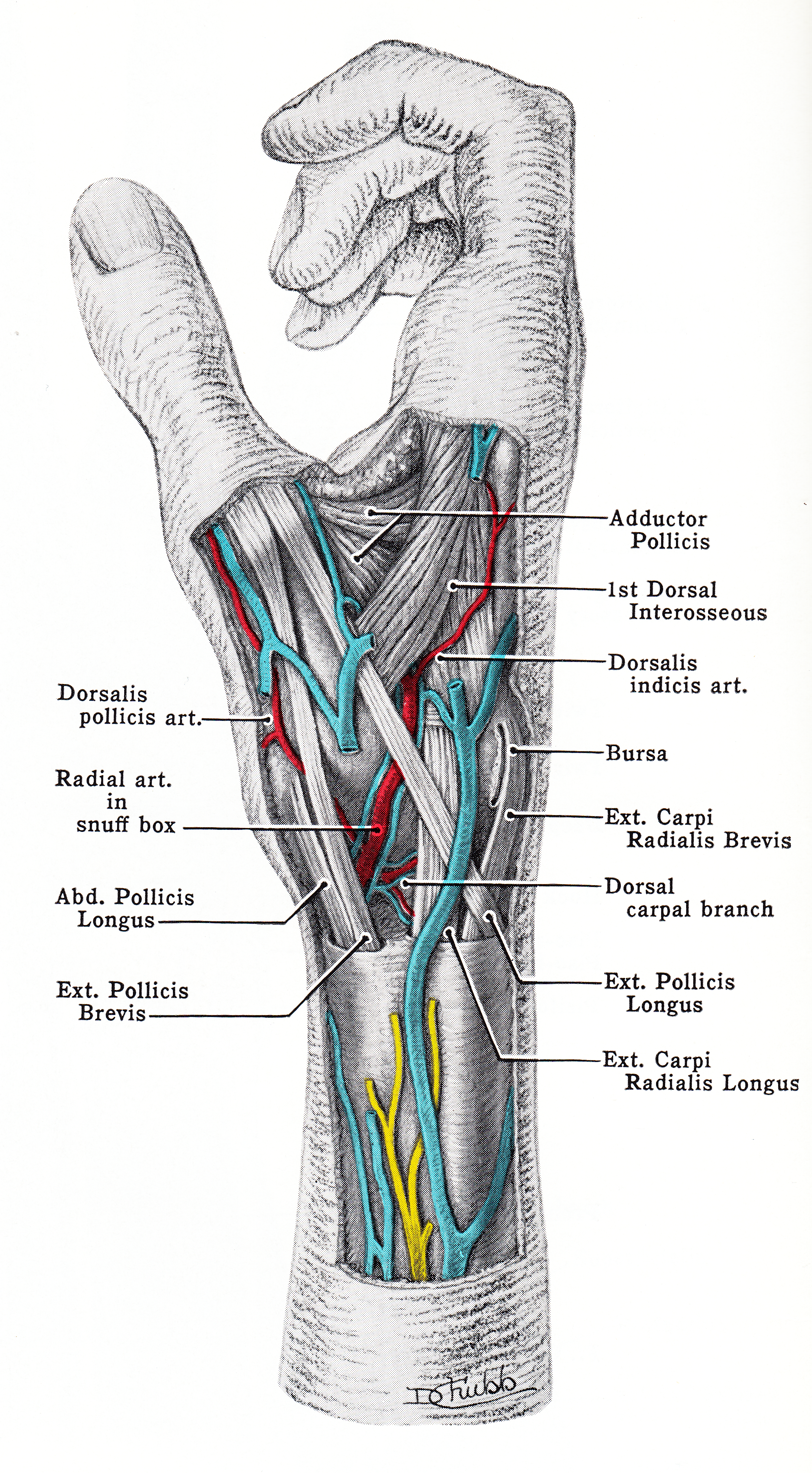
Picture showing the radial artery in the anatomical snuffbox.

In human anatomy, the radial artery is the main artery of the lateral aspect of the forearm.

== Structure ==
The radial artery arises from the bifurcation of the brachial artery in the antecubital fossa. It runs distally on the anterior part of the forearm. There, it serves as a landmark for the division between the anterior and posterior compartments of the forearm, with the posterior compartment beginning just lateral to the artery. The artery winds laterally around the wrist, passing through the anatomical snuff box and between the heads of the first dorsal interosseous muscle. It passes anteriorly between the heads of the adductor pollicis, and becomes the deep palmar arch, which joins with the deep branch of the ulnar artery.

Along its course, it is accompanied by a similarly named vein, the radial vein.

=== Branches ===
The named branches of the radial artery may be divided into three groups, corresponding with the three regions in which the vessel is situated.

==== In the forearm ====
- Radial recurrent artery - arises just after the radial artery comes off the brachial artery. It travels superiorly to anastomose with the radial collateral artery around the elbow joint
- Palmar carpal branch of radial artery - a small vessel which arises near the lower border of the pronator quadratus
- Superficial palmar branch of the radial artery - arises from the radial artery, just where this vessel is about to wind around the lateral side of the wrist.

==== At the wrist ====
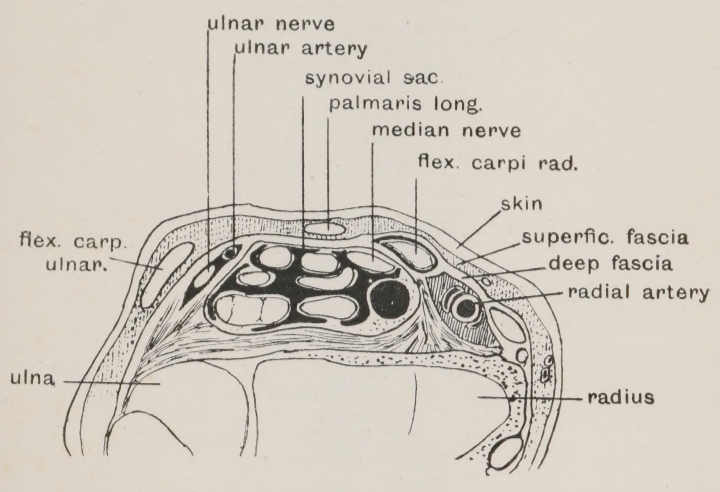
Transverse section through the left wrist, showing the radial artery at the gouttière du pouls. (After Hughes.)

- Dorsal carpal branch of radial artery - a small vessel which arises beneath the extensor tendons of the thumb
- First dorsal metacarpal artery - arises just before the radial artery passes between the two heads of the first dorsal interosseous muscle and divides almost immediately into two branches which supply the adjacent sides of the thumb and index finger; the lateral side of the thumb receives a branch directly from the radial artery.

==== In the hand ====
- Princeps pollicis artery - arises from the radial artery just as it turns medially to the deep part of the hand.
- Radialis indicis - arises close to the princeps pollicis. The two arteries may arise from a common trunk, the first palmar metacarpal artery.
- Deep palmar arch - terminal part of radial artery.

=== Variations ===
In less than 1% of the population, the radial artery takes a superficial course in the anatomical snuff box. This arterial variation can be mistaken for the cephalic vein as accidental injection of this variant radial artery has been reported. Identifying arterial pulsation in the anatomical snuff box is therefore recommended.

== Clinical significance ==
The radial artery lies superficially in front of the distal end of the radius, between the tendons of the brachioradialis and flexor carpi radialis; it is here (the so-called gouttière du pouls) that clinician takes the radial pulse. (where it is commonly used to assess the heart rate and cardiac rhythm). Presence of radial pulse was thought to indicate a systolic blood pressure of at least 70 mmHg, as estimated from the 50% percentile, although this was found to generally be an overestimation of a patient's true blood pressure. The radial artery can be less easily felt as it crosses the anatomical snuff box. The radial artery is used for coronary artery bypass grafting and is growing in popularity among cardiac surgeons. Recently, it has been shown to have a superior peri-operative and post-operative course when compared to saphenous vein grafts.

The radial artery is often punctured in a common procedure to obtain an arterial blood gas. Such a procedure may first involve an Allen's test.

The radial artery is also used to evaluate the collateral circulation of blood through the hands; applying pressure through palpating the palmar arches results in paleness over the area being compressed; adequate collateral circulation can be ascertained by how quickly normal colour returns after the pressure is removed.

The radial artery is a common site for the insertion of an arterial line, such as for blood pressure monitoring in an intensive care unit. It is also commonly used for cerebral angiograms for the treatment of cerebral pathologies, such as strokes, cerebral aneurysms It is selected because it is accessible, and because of the low incidence of complications such as thrombosis.

== Additional images ==
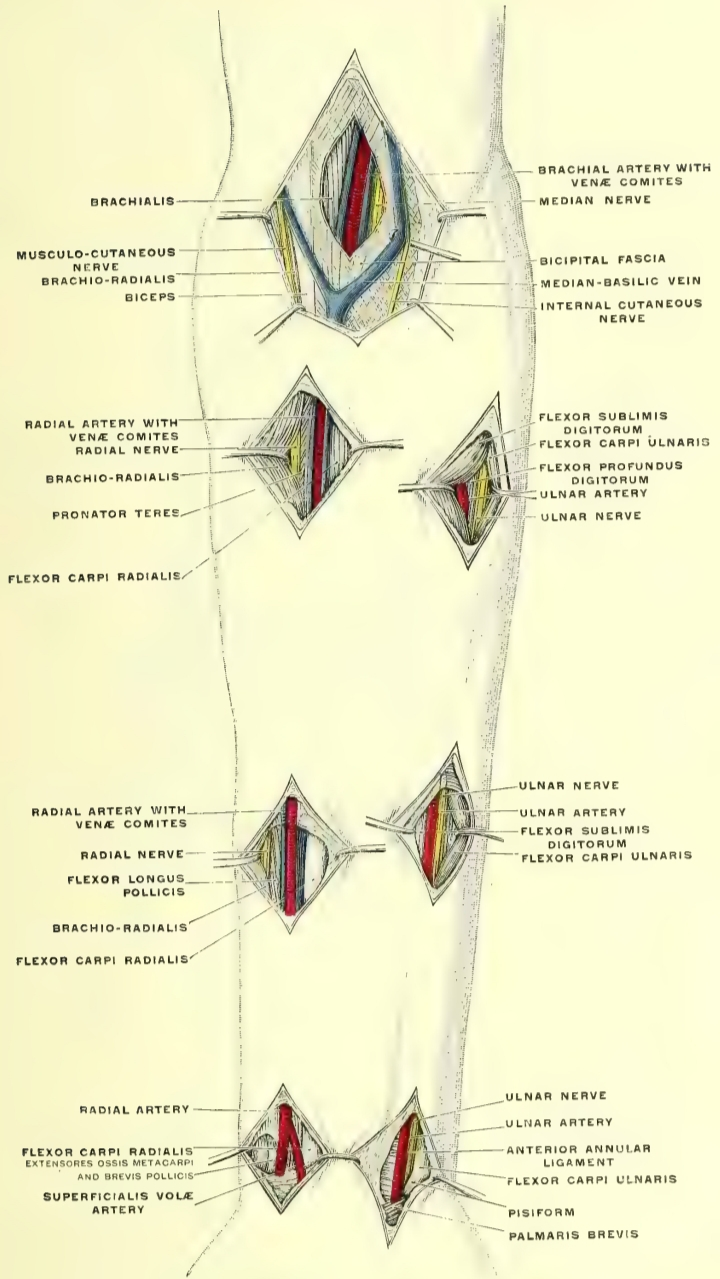
Surgical relations of the radial and ulnar arteries; right side, anterior view. (After Gerrish.)

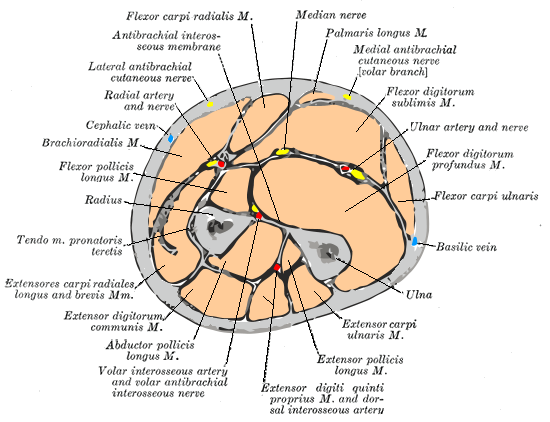
Cross-section through the middle of the right forearm.

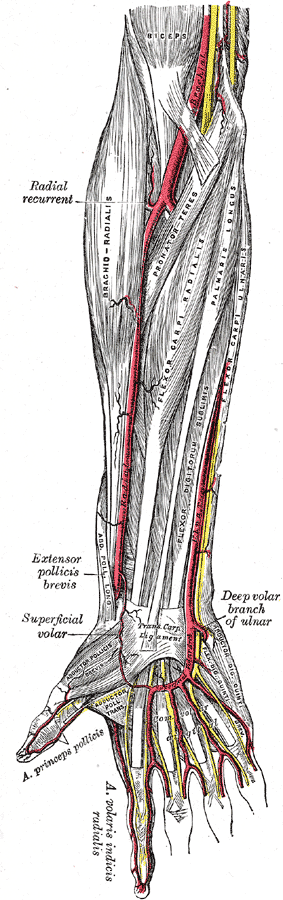
The radial and ulnar arteries.

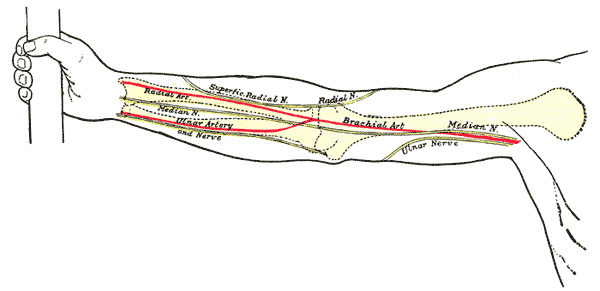
Front of right upper extremity, showing surface markings for bones, arteries, and nerves.

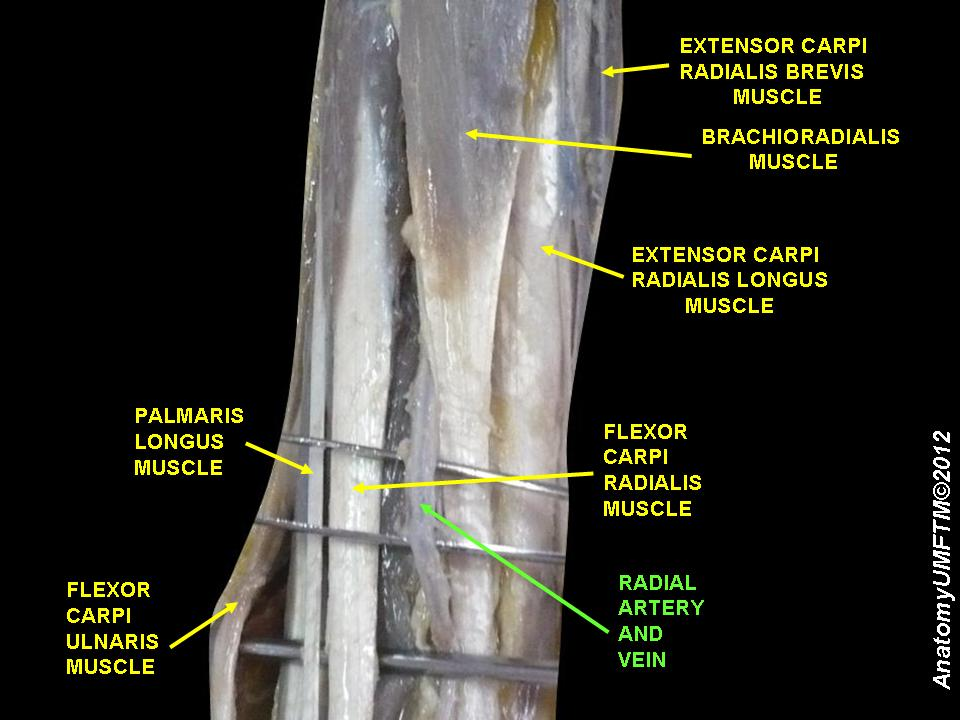
Radial artery and vein

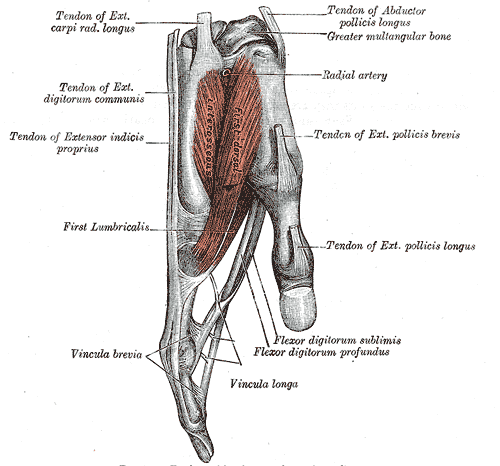
Radial artery in the anatomical snuffbox.

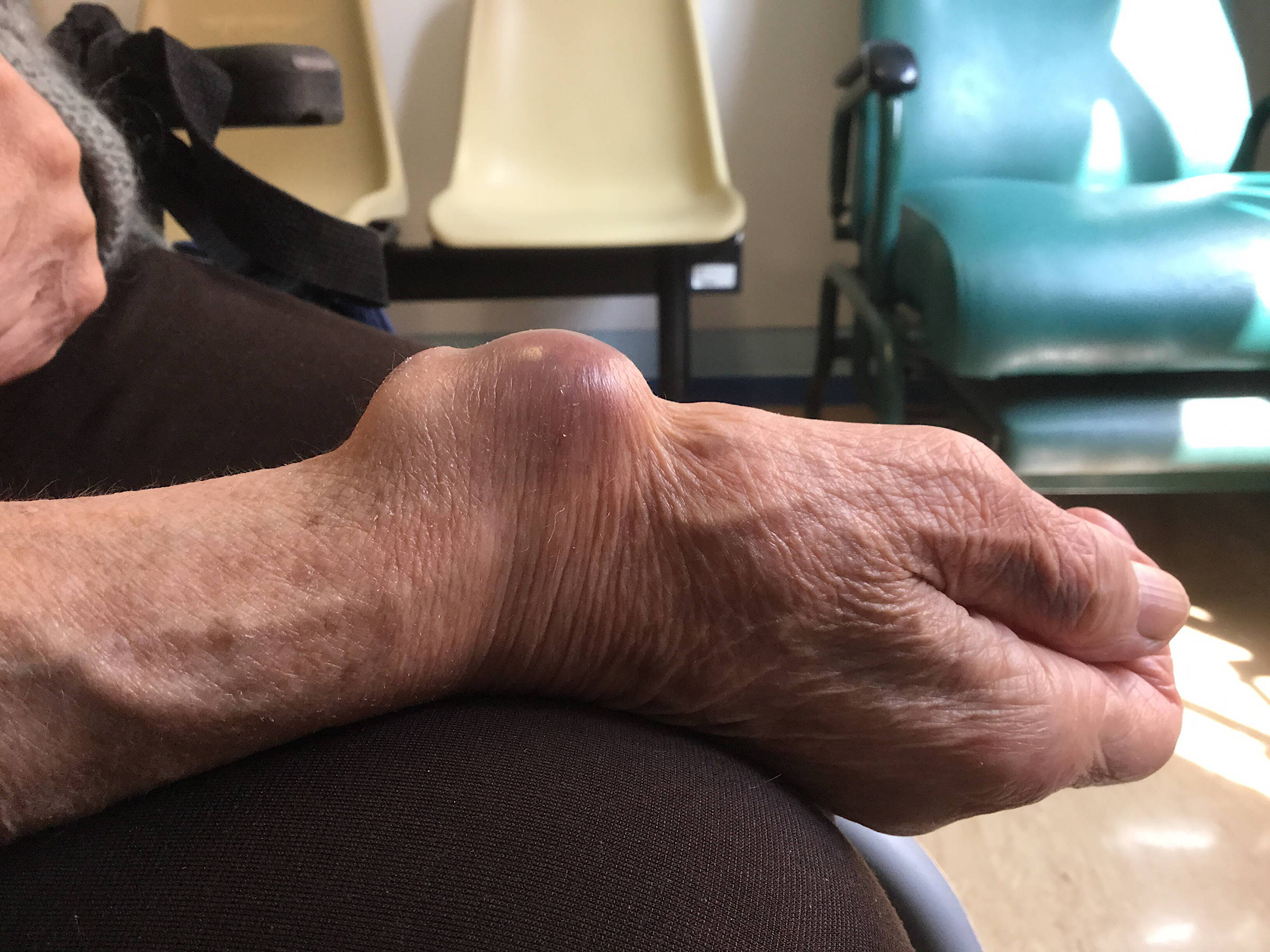
Pseudaneurysm involving the radial artery.

== See also ==
Cimino fistula
