= Dorsal carpal arch =

- Arteries of the hand

Details
- Source: Dorsal carpal branch of the radial artery, dorsal carpal branch of the ulnar artery
- Branches: Dorsal metacarpal arteries

Identifiers
- Latin: rete carpale dorsale
- TA98: A12.2.09.033
- TA2: 4647

The dorsal carpal arch (dorsal carpal network, posterior carpal arch) is an anatomical term for the combination (anastomosis) of dorsal carpal branch of the radial artery and the dorsal carpal branch of the ulnar artery near the back of the wrist.

It is made up of the dorsal carpal branches of both the ulnar and radial arteries. It also anastomoses with the anterior interosseous artery and the posterior interosseous artery. The arch gives off three dorsal metacarpal arteries.

It serves as a source of blood supply to the radiocarpal joint alongside the palmar carpal arch.

== See also ==
- Palmar carpal arch
- Deep palmar arch
- Superficial palmar arch
