= Corregidora (novel) =

Novel by Gayl Jones

- First edition (publ. Random House); Cover art by Wendell Minor
- Author: Gayl Jones
- Language: English
- Publisher: Random House
- Publication date: 1975
- ISBN: 0-394-49323-0 (first edition)
- Dewey Decimal: 813.54
- LC Class: PZ4.J7553 Co

Corregidora is a 1975 novel by Gayl Jones. It is Jones’s debut novel. Corregidora is considered part of a tradition of African American literary fiction and literature inspired by blues music. Utilizing a non-linear, fragmented narrative style, the novel weaves a lineage of historical trauma into its protagonist's present experience. Through this structure, it explores interconnected themes of transgenerational trauma, oral memory, domestic and sexual violence, and Black womanhood. Corregidora has been acclaimed by critics, particularly for its innovative voice and raw portrayal of intergenerational memory.

Corregidora is set in Kentucky in the 1940s. The novel centers around Ursa Corregidora, recently hospitalized after an accident. The first three sections of the novel follow Ursa through her recovery, her changing relationships, and her profession as a blues singer. The final two sections of Corregidora flash forward to 1969 when her estranged husband returns.

== Story ==
In 1940s Kentucky, blues singer Ursa Corregidora suffers a miscarriage and a hysterectomy after a violent staircase alteration by her husband, Mutt Thomas. Following her recovery and divorce, she enters a brief second marriage with her employer, but after discovering his infidelity leaves him to live independently and perform at a new venue.

Ursa’s present experiences regularly blend with memories of her youth, her abusive first marriage, and her family's intergenerational legacy of sexual violence. Seeking clarity about her identity, she visits her mother to uncover the painful history of her estranged parents. Decades later, a forty-seven-year-old Ursa reunites with Mutt. Despite her lingering trauma, she returns with him, bringing her face-to-face with the complex nexus of desire, hatred, and ancestral memory that binds them.

== Characters ==
- Ursa Corregidora: A 25-year-old Black blues singer burdened by her family's ancestral legacy of enslavement and sexual trauma. Physical trauma early in the novel leaves her infertile, compounding her ongoing struggle with identity and memory.
- Mutt Thomas: Ursa’s volatile first husband, whose intense jealousy, possessiveness, and need for control derail their marriage. He remains a persistent presence throughout her life.
- Tadpole McCormick: The square-jawed owner of Happy's Café who provides shelter during Ursa’s physical recovery and briefly becomes her second husband.
- Catherine (Cat) Lawson: A neighbor and hairdresser who offers temporary care to Ursa. Her hidden lesbianism and complex domestic life lead to a permanent rift between them.
- Jeffrene (Jeffy): A young girl mentored by Cat whose unwanted sexual advance forces Ursa to leave Cat's home.
- Sal Cooper: A friendly daytime employee at Happy's Café who maintains a casual acquaintance with Ursa.
- Jimmy: Mutt’s cousin who acts as an occasional liaison between Ursa and her estranged husband.
- Max: The pragmatic owner of the Spider club who respects Ursa’s talent after she firmly rebuffs his romantic advances.

== Themes ==
=== Generational trauma ===
Gayl Jones opens the novel in the 1940s, but the temporal landscape of the Corregidora women begins in 19th century Brazil with Great Gram or “Dorita” — the woman with the coffee-bean skin, the "favorite" of Corregidora, the Portuguese slaveholder. Jones’ novel traces the histories of the Corregidora women through Ursa, the great-grandchild of Dorita, illustrating a genealogical history contrived through an economy of sexual violence rendered by slavery. In turn, the Corregidora women embody a practice of remembrance, or "holding up evidence" by "making generations", in such a way that specifies their wombs as a site of redoubling- a redoubling that centralizes their purported reproductive capacities as a conduit for both reprisal and redress that renders their trauma legible. For Ursa, the space of the past consumes and entraps her, becoming her identity. The past becomes a restricting force as Ursa longs for an individual life separate and outside of Corregidora.

Ursa Corregidora's narrative is intertwined with the histories of the slave owner, Corregidora, and her female ancestors. Ursa's Great Gram was a slave of Corregidora who he raped, and she became pregnant with Gram. Gram was then raped by Corregidora and became pregnant with Ursa's mother. Ursa's family moved to Louisiana after the abolition of slavery in Portugal. At as early as five-years of age, Ursa describes her grandmother telling her these histories and insisting she remember them. Ursa carries the history of these traumas with her everywhere, and they impact how she develops her relationships. Both Mutt and Tadpole question the significance of the stories of Corregidora and how they affect Ursa's romances. The generational trauma passed down by her maternal ancestry is a prominent topic throughout the novel.

The connection between trauma and memory is often discussed in scholarly articles about Corregidora. In particular, academics have considered how Ursa's familial trauma under slavery affects her romantic relationships in the present. In her critical essay, Stella Setka discusses the impacts of this "traumatic rememory" inherited from her ancestry. Setka considers how this collective trauma influences Ursa's sexuality and agency.

=== Preservation of memory ===
Ursa describes a pressure from her mother and grandmother to "make generations." After one night with Martin, a man who worked at the café across the street, Ursa's mother becomes pregnant with her. She describes that her whole body wanted Ursa. Ursa feels this urge to "make generations" but is unable to do so after her hysterectomy. Ursa's grandmother emphasizes how important it is to continue sharing their histories of sexual violence and slavery. The women use their lineage and oral history as a documentation of the truth to be used as evidence. By preserving these memories through their children, the Corregidora women plan to ensure that their stories are never forgotten.

Literary scholars have emphasized how the Corregidora actively preserve memory through their oral histories. According to this discussion, the ongoing recounting of Corregidora history becomes enmeshed with the present narrative in the novel. Abdennebi Ben Beya is one of the scholars analyzing this tension between past and present. Beya considers history to be a haunting presence in Corregidora, emphasizing the simultaneous mourning and healing in re-experiencing this trauma.

The carrying forth, working through and bearing witness to trauma(s) are memory preservation methods. Great Gram, Gram, Mama and Ursa each carry re-membering(s) in their bodies and in their names. The repetition of Corregidora's is how Great Gram, Gram, Mama and Ursa hold on to what Christina Sharpe calls a "long psychic and material reach" (p. 4) of the traumas of chattel slavery and sexual violence. How they respectively respond to, live, witness and work through these traumas spills out into their interactions with each other and the other Black people they encounter, live with, have sex with and socialize with throughout the text. Ursa is both a witness to generations of trauma, through the re-hearing of the stories and through living with the women who lived the recounted experiences, and positioned to work through its effects in ways that Great Gram, Gram and Mama will never be able to. Ursa also represents what will not be worked through as she cannot/will not create more generations. There is a witness and work stoppage with Ursa and the last man she is with in the novel. At first thought, Ursa's return to Mutt seemed like a choice rooted in an inability to work through the trauma she experienced in her own body and those of her foremothers. Upon deeper reflection, Ursa's return resonates as her way of continuing that work and witnessing through confronting a vehicle of trauma (Mutts verbal abuse, controlling demands and later physical violence) in ways that her foremother did not narrate directly to her, but she senses or realizes. ‘‘In a split second I knew what it was, in a split second of love and hate I knew what it was, and I think he might have known too." (p. 62) Jones leaves the reader in that moment of remembering, re-enacting and mal/attempt towards reversal.

=== Sexual and domestic violence ===
The initial conflict presented in the novel is how Ursa's fall causes her to lose a fetus and her uterus. While Ursa's neighbors and friends claim that it was an accident, Ursa states that Mutt knocked her down the stairs, indicating that it was an instance of domestic violence. Ursa's mother is also hit repeatedly by Ursa's father when visiting him to return an envelope he sent with money. Since Ursa's grandmothers were raped by their slaveowners, Jones writes a violent history for all of the Corregidora women. Ursa's hysterectomy and the history of violence in her family affect how she navigates her sexuality throughout the novel.

In critical essays that discuss Corregidora, the theme of sexual and domestic violence is connected to the themes of trauma and history. Because the violence in Ursa's intimate relationships is reflected in the rape and trauma the Corregidora women underwent in slavery, scholars draw connections between painful collective memories and the violence in the present narrative. Specifically, Joanne Lipson Freed points out the duplication of sexual exploitation in each of the lives of each Corregidora woman. Freed ties the repetition of trauma into the collective memory of the African American community.

Particularly in Aliyyah Abdur-Rahman's Against the Closet: Black Political Longing and the Erotics of Race, Abdur-Rahman reads incest as a motif in contemporary Black women's literature. Moving from Baldwin to Morrison to Jones to concretize incest as motif, she encapsulates the ways in which incest as a figurative sexual arrangement is conditioned upon an unintelligibility — a “disruptive chronology”, fragmented subjectivities, and traces of the tragic, the obscene, and parodic — made manifest by the line of Corregidora women that ends and finds release with Ursa (Abdur-Rahman 127). The unintelligibility of the text rests alongside her contention that black woman/motherhood and black girlhood “exist along the same continuum of black female representation” — such as Ursa's incapacity for to speak plainly and her reliance on the blues.

=== Womanhood and motherhood ===
The Corregidora women Ursa recounts in the novel form a matrilineal ancestry. Particularly, Ursa describes the histories of her Great Gram, Gram, and Mama. Ursa describes how the Corregidora women were compelled to "make generations," connecting motherhood to remembering their trauma. Ursa describes a responsibility in her family to become women by bearing children. When Ursa has a hysterectomy, she also concerns herself with how being unable to have children will affect her womanhood. Ursa's loss of a child also connects motherhood and womanhood to the violence in Corregidora.

Academic articles that evaluate Jones' Corregidora recurrently analyze the themes of womanhood and motherhood. Scholars consider how these two topics are connected in the experiences of the Corregidora women. Ifeona Fulani analyzes how the mother-daughter relationships in the novel frame the black female subject. Fulani takes a psychological approach to understanding this correlation, noting the influence of gender and conflict on the community.

== Critical response ==
Gayl Jones' use of language in Corregidora has been highly regarded since its publication in 1975. Particularly, critics have placed Gayl Jones among a canon of Black women writers for her manipulation of structure and speech as literary devices. Critics have also praised Jones' emphasis on the oral history of African American language.

Other than the overall favorable critical response Jones has received for Corregidora, the novel has been critiqued for lacking detailed physical descriptions of its characters. In an interview by Claudia Tate, Gayl Jones describes her intention to draw on the African American tradition of oral storytelling. Tate's subsequent remark that Corregidora felt like a private story in her reading forms the critique that the novel is unable to reproduce an oral history.

Writers including James Baldwin and Maya Angelou have commented on Corregidora as honest and painful as well as a murky American tale (respectfully).
