= Palmar carpal branch of ulnar artery =

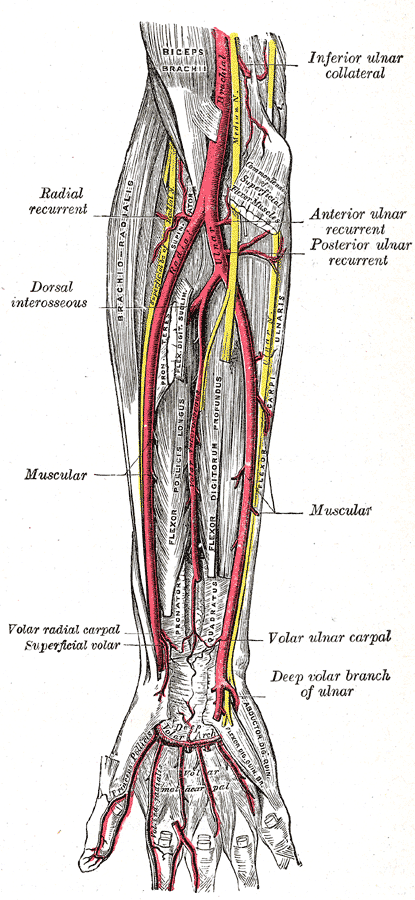
- Ulnar and radial arteries. Deep view. (Palmar carpal branch of radial artery labeled as "volar ulnar carpal", at lower right.)

Details
- Source: Ulnar artery
- Branches: Palmar carpal arch

Identifiers
- Latin: ramus carpalis palmaris arteriae ulnaris
- TA98: A12.2.09.054
- TA2: 4669
- FMA: 22817

The palmar carpal branch of ulnar artery (volar carpal branch) is a small vessel which crosses the front of the carpus beneath the tendons of the Flexor digitorum profundus, and anastomoses with the corresponding branch of the radial artery.
