= Gayl Jones =

American poet (born 1949)

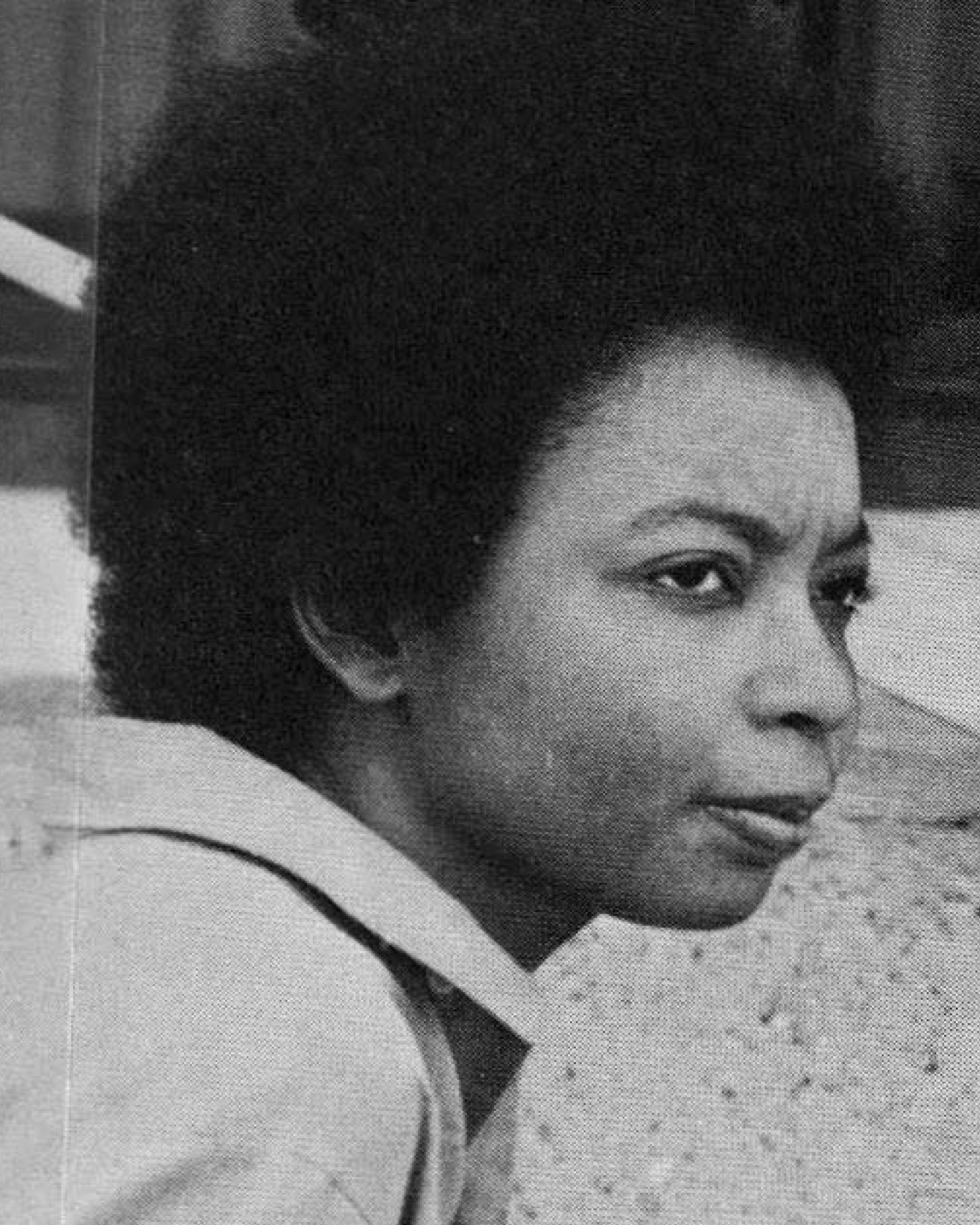
- Jones in 1971
- Born: Gayl Carolyn Jones; November 23, 1949 (age 76); Lexington, Kentucky, U.S.
- Education: Connecticut College (BA); Brown University (MA, DArts)
- Occupations: Novelist; poet; playwright; professor; literary critic
- Writing career
- Genre: African-American literature
- Notable works: Corregidora (1975); Eva's Man (1976); The Healing (1998); Palmares (2021); The Unicorn Woman (2024)

Gayl Carolyn Jones (born November 23, 1949) is an American writer from Lexington, Kentucky. She is recognized as a key figure in 20th-century African-American literature.

Jones published her debut novel, Corregidora (1975), at the age of 25. The book, edited by Toni Morrison, was met with critical acclaim and praised by leading intellectuals including James Baldwin and John Updike. Her sophomore novel Eva's Man was met with less renown and characterized as "dangerous" by some critics for its raw depiction of cruelty and violence. Jones continued publishing in the late 1990s, releasing The Healing and Mosquito—the former of which was shortlisted for the National Book Award. Following her husband's widely reported suicide in 1998, Jones withdrew from public life. In 2021, she published Palmares, her first novel in 22 years; it was a finalist for the 2022 Pulitzer Prize for Fiction.

Scholar Imani Perry, writing in The New York Times, described Jones as "one of the most versatile and transformative writers of the 20th century", while Calvin Baker described her as "The Best American Novelist Whose Name You May Not Know." In The Guardian newspaper, Yara Rodrigues Fowler stated: "Gayl Jones is a literary legend. In novels and poetry, she has reimagined the lives of Black women across North, South and Central America, living in different centuries, in a way no other writer has done."

== Early life and education ==
Jones was born on November 23, 1949, to Franklin and Lucille Jones. Her father was a cook and her mother a homemaker and writer. Jones grew up in Speigle Heights, a neighborhood of Lexington, Kentucky, in a house with no indoor toilet. Jones grew up in a storytelling family: Her grandmother wrote plays for her church, and her mother constantly made up stories to entertain the children and other family members. Jones recalled, "I began to write when I was seven, because I saw my mother writing, and because she would read stories to my brother and me, stories that she had written". Although she was described as painfully shy, many of Jones's elementary school instructors recognized her writing skills and encouraged her talent to grow.

Jones first attended segregated schools but for high school enrolled as one of the few Black students at Henry Clay High School. She was academically successful and earned a recommendation, through writer Elizabeth Hardwick, to Connecticut College. There she became a student of poets William Meredith and Robert Hayden. She graduated in 1971, receiving her Bachelor of Arts degree in English. While attending the college she also earned the Frances Steloff Award for Fiction. She then began a graduate program in creative writing at Brown University, studying under poet Michael Harper and earning a Master of Arts in 1973 and a Doctor of Arts in 1975.

== Career ==
Jones's mentor, Michael Harper, introduced her work to author Toni Morrison. Morrison was an editor at Random House at the time and was so impressed after reading Jones's manuscript that she wrote that "no novel about any black woman could ever be the same after this". In 1975, Jones published her first novel Corregidora at the age of 26. That same year she was a visiting lecturer at the University of Michigan, which hired her the following year as an assistant professor. She left her faculty position in 1983 and moved to Europe, where she wrote and published Die Vogelfaengerin (The Birdwatcher) in Germany, and a poetry collection, Xarque and Other Poems. Her work features in anthologies including Confirmation: An Anthology of African American Women (1983, edited by Imamu Amiri Baraka and Amina Baraka) and Daughters of Africa (1992, edited by Margaret Busby).

Jones's 1998 novel The Healing was a finalist for the National Book Award, although the media attention surrounding her novel's release focused more on the controversy in her personal life than on the work itself. Her papers are currently housed at the Howard Gotlieb Archival Research Center at Boston University. Jones currently lives in Lexington, Kentucky, where she continues to write.

Jones has described herself as an improvisor, and her work bears out that statement: like a jazz or blues musician, Jones plays upon a specific set of themes, varying them and exploring their possible permutations. Though her fiction has been called "Gothic" in its exploration of madness, violence, and sexuality, musical metaphors might make for a more apt categorization.

=== Corregidora ===
Jones's first novel, Corregidora (1975), anticipated the wave of novels exploring the connections between slavery and the African-American present. Its publication coincided with the peak of the Black Arts Movement and concepts of "Africanism." It was precursor to the Women's Renaissance of the 1980s, often identified by its acknowledgement of the multiplicity of African-American identities and renewed interest in history and slavery. Authors associated with the Black Women's Movement include Alice Walker, Toni Morrison, Paule Marshall, among others.

The novel moves across different geographic spaces, from Brazil, to a moment in St. Louis, but is predominantly set in Kentucky. Ursa Corregidora, the novel's protagonist, is a blues singer searching for "a song that would touch me, touch my life and theirs ... A song branded with the new world" (59). Ursa's search reflects her struggle to construct selfhood amidst the traumatic stories told by her great-grandmother and grandmother of their experiences at the hands of the Portuguese Brazilian slaveholder Simon Corregidora. Ursa's matrilineal line—great-grandmother, grandmother, and mother—make it their lives' purpose to keep alive the history of their abuse and torture, and by extension that of African slaves in the New World. From the age of five onward, Ursa inherits the duty to "make generations" that can testify to the brutal crimes of slavery. But the Corregidora women's obsession with the past burdens Ursa, who struggles, as a singer, to find her own purpose in life. Even as she attempts to do so, she herself is trapped in abusive relationships.

When Ursa and her husband Mutt get into a physical altercation regarding her refusal to stop singing, she falls (or is pushed) down a flight of stairs, loses her unborn baby, and has an emergency hysterectomy. The year is 1948. Unable to birth the generations necessary to pass down the Corregidora narrative, Ursa loses any fragile sense of self she previously had. She divorces Mutt, unwilling to forgive him for taking away her sole purpose in life, and attempts to heal under the watchful eyes of her friends Tadpole McCormick (owner of Happy's Café, where Ursa sings) and Catherine Lawson (bisexual hairstylist, who lives across the street from Happy's). Ursa moves in with Cat briefly after realizing her stay at Tad's is forcing romantic relations with him. However, at Cat's, Ursa receives unwanted sexual attention from a young girl Jeffy, who she realizes is Cat's lover. Confronted with their lesbianism, Ursa promptly returns to Tad's, and the two marry shortly thereafter. Yet, Ursa and Tad's marriage fails to be any different from the abusive, possessive relationship with Mutt. Ursa finds Tad in bed with another woman and moves out. Jones succinctly renders the destructive romantic relationships between Black men and women, a lingering effect of the patriarchal slave system where Black bodies were abused and consumed.

In order to heal, Ursa seeks out her mother's story, a tale overshadowed by Great Gram and Gram's experiences in Old Man Corregidora's plantation-brothel. Mama, similarly taught to associate sex with violence, has only slept with one man, Ursa's father Martin, on one occasion. Despite his willingness to marry her and move in with her, Mama was unable to reciprocate a romantic relationship and eventually caused Martin to hate her. Martin returned the humiliation he felt when Mama visited him after the birth of Ursa. After smacking Mama around, Martin ripped her clothes and made her walk through the streets like a "whore." Mama and Martin's relationship exemplifies what could happen to Ursa if she doesn't find a way to live her own life, rather than just rehearsing that of her foremothers. With this new knowledge, Ursa redoubles her efforts in blues singing and begins to heal. When she reunites with Mutt, 22 years after their divorce, the two attempt to reconcile. During an act of fellatio, Ursa decides not to repeat her great-grandmother's secret act in which she bit the penis of Old Man Corregidora. Critics have interpreted this ending very differently: some seeing Ursa's refusal to repeat the past a sign of a disruption of the obliterating cycle and indicative of her reconciliation with Mutt, while others argue Ursa fails to resist abusive heterosexual relationships and therefore becomes a passive, unrealized heroine.

Incest is a major theme in a novel, and a recurring trope in the works of other prominent African-American writers at the time, including: Toni Morrison (The Bluest Eye), Maya Angelou's (I Know Why the Caged Bird Sings), Alice Walker's (The Child Who Favored Daughter), and James Baldwin's (Just Above My Head). Aliyyah Abdur-Rahman, in her book Against the Closet: Identity, Political Longing, and Black Figuration discusses incest as a "central trope through which black female identity and black familial dilemmas are figured in African American women's writing in the period after black Americans were purportedly granted equal rights before the law". In her close readings of late twentieth-century African-American literary texts, Abdur-Rahman's argues that writing about the trope of incest in black women's literature illuminates the continuing impact of slavery on the formation of black families in the post-civil rights period. Abdur-Rahman sees the incest motif as a site to "critique society for its egregious neglect of black women and children." By focusing on the time period of the late twentieth century, when Corregidora was written, Abdur-Rahman reads the employment of the incest motif as a critique on the masculinity inherent in black nationalism and its impact on the formation of black families arguing that "representing incest allows black American women writers to highlight the effects of civil rights retrenchment and the waning popularity of a largely masculinist black nationalist agenda on black families in the late twentieth century."

Throughout the novel, Ursa must navigate relationships of control over her body and sexuality imposed by different characters. Her relatives (Great-Gram, Gram and her mother) need her body to serve as a tool of procreation (make generation) and produce a child that represents material evidence of the horrors of incest and rape they experienced during slavery at the hands of Simon Corregidora. The rape and incest that occurs between Great Gram, Gram and Simon can be read as complicating the notions of love and hate, desire and danger. Similarly, Ursa's relationship with her husband Mutt also straddles the line between the two sentiments. Mutt seeks to restrict Ursa's sexuality only for his enjoyment and pushes her down the stairs at the beginning of the novel because of his jealousy at other men staring at her on-stage performance while she sings the Blues. Her second husband, Tad, seeks to engage with Ursa's sexuality in a normative manner that illustrates his ability to provide sexual pleasure for her, despite her hysterectomy and modified sexual desire. Jones complicates notions of sexuality by showing how desire can exist in undesirable circumstances. Or as Ursa sees it, "Two humps on the same camel? Yes. Hate and desire both riding them" (102).

Sparse in language, relying on terse dialogue and haunting interior monologues, the novel stands in the naturalist tradition as it shows individuals fighting with historical forces beyond their control. However, the end of the novel justifies its status as a "blues" narrative exploring both the pain and the beauty of relationships by implying that psychological struggle and an unsparing confrontation of the past may lead to recovery.

When asked about the relationship between literate and oral traditions in Corregidora Jones said, "Ursa in Corregidora tells her own story in her own language and so does Eva in Eva's Man. I was interested in having their language do everything that anybody's language used as a literary language can do. But once after I gave a talk on Corregidora, a professor (I should say a white professor) expressed surprise that I didn't talk like Ursa. That my vocabulary wasn't like hers. The implication of course was that I was more "articulate," at least within an accepted linguistic tradition. So because of that and because of other things—other comments about my language in those books—I've been wondering about my own voice—my other voice(s) and how it (they) relate to the voices of those women. I trust those voices, but always with black writers there's the suspicion that they can't create language/voices as other writers can—that they can't invent a linguistic world in the same way."

=== Eva's Man ===
Eva's Man (1976), Jones's second novel, expands on the painful relationships between African-American women and men, but it does so with an even greater sense of hopelessness. Like Corregidora, Eva's Man relies on minimalist dialogue and on interior monologues, but the latter play an even more important role in Jones' second novel, letting the reader see Eva Medina Canada's past and her descent into mental illness, indicated through repetition of key scenes with variations, implying that Eva's memory disintegrates. The reader encounters Eva in a prison for the criminally insane at the beginning of the story, to which she has been committed for poisoning and castrating her lover. Her flashbacks reveal a life of relentless sexual objectification by men, starting with Freddy, a neighborhood boy who wants to play doctor, to Tyrone, her mother's lover who molests her, to her cousin, who propositions her. The men she encounters regard her as sexual property and react with violence if she rejects their approaches. Davis, the lover she kills, epitomizes this tendency by imprisoning her in a room to which he only comes to sleep with her. By killing him, she rebels against male tyranny, but her descent into insanity indicates that she is unable to construct a new role for herself.

=== White Rat ===
The stories in Jones' short story collection White Rat (1977), written between 1970 and 1977, deal largely with the same themes as her novels: communication or the lack of it, insanity, and difficult relationships. Song for Anninho (1981), a long narrative poem, covers new ground. Situated in 17th-century Brazil, the poem tells the story of Almeyda, the narrator, and her husband Anninho, who are residents of Palmares, a historical settlement by fugitive slaves, when it is overrun by Portuguese soldiers, separating husband and wife. Though Almeyda can only find her husband through memory and through art once they are separated, the poem focuses on desire as a positive theme, and it shows the possibility of love.

== Awards and recognition ==
The Healing was a National Book Award finalist for fiction in 1998.

Her novel Palmares (2021), about "the largest and best known of Brazil's quilombos, communities established by Africans who had escaped slavery", was a 2022 Pulitzer Prize Finalist in Fiction.

In 2022, Jones was honored for lifetime achievement at 43rd annual American Book Awards, presented by Ishmael Reed's Before Columbus Foundation. Her novel, The Birdcatcher, was a National Book Award finalist for fiction in 2022. Her 2024 novel The Unicorn Woman was named a finalist for the Pulitzer Prize on May 5, 2025. The Unicorn Woman received a 2025 PEN Oakland/Josephine Miles Literary Award.

== Personal life ==
While studying at the University of Michigan, Jones met a politically active student, Robert Higgins, who would eventually become her husband. At a gay rights parade in Ann Arbor, Michigan, in the early 1980s, Higgins claimed to be God and that AIDS was a form of punishment. After being punched by a woman at the parade, he returned with a shotgun and was arrested with a charge that carried four years in jail. Instead of appearing in court to face charges, Jones and Higgins fled the United States to Europe, and Jones resigned from the University of Michigan with a note addressed to President Ronald Reagan that read: "I reject your lying racist [expletive], and I call upon God. Do what you want. God is with Bob and I'm with him." Some have debated the authorship of the note. In 1988, Jones and Higgins returned to the United States, but kept their identities hidden.

In the late 1990s, Jones's mother was diagnosed with throat cancer. In 1997 Higgins objected to a medical procedure for his mother-in-law, but was banned from the hospital room after a psychological evaluation on Jones's mother found she was "inappropriately manipulated by family--especially son-in-law." Jones and Higgins wrote a document about the incident called "Kidnapped/Held Incommunicado," which was sent to the national press, and on March 3, 1997, was forwarded to President Bill Clinton and Vice President Al Gore. On March 20, Jones's mother died, inspiring Higgins to start a campaign against the University of Kentucky Markey Cancer Center, which had been the defendant in several civil rights cases in the recent past. During this time, Jones's novel The Healing was in the process of being released. Higgins began to call and write the Lexington police multiple times a day. A letter received by the police station on February 20, 1998, indicated a bomb threat, and police determined that Higgins, who at the time was using the alias Bob Jones, was previously wanted for arrest. After a standoff with police at their residence, Higgins committed suicide and Jones was put on suicide watch. Since then, Jones has only talked to family and Harper and has refused several requests for interviews. Prior to this, Jones gave several interviews, including one with her mother in the pages of Obsidian and another in Claudia Tate's canonical anthology Black Women Writers.

== Selected bibliography ==
=== Fiction ===
- Corregidora (novel) (1975)
- Eva's Man (novel) (1976)
- White Rat (short stories) (1977)
- Ravenna (short story) (1986)
- The Healing (novel) (1998)
- Mosquito (novel) (1999)
- Palmares (novel) (2021)
- The Birdcatcher (novel) (2022)
- Butter (two novellas and ten stories) (2023)
- The Unicorn Woman (2024)

=== Poetry ===
- Song for Anninho (1981)
- The Hermit-Woman (1983)
- Xarque and Other Poems (1985)
- Deep Song and Other Poems (2020)
- Song for Almeyda and Song for Anninho (2022)

=== Other works ===
- Chile Woman (play) (1974)
- Liberating Voices: Oral Tradition in African American Literature (criticism) (1991)

== See also ==
- African-American literature
