= Dorsal carpal branch of the ulnar artery =

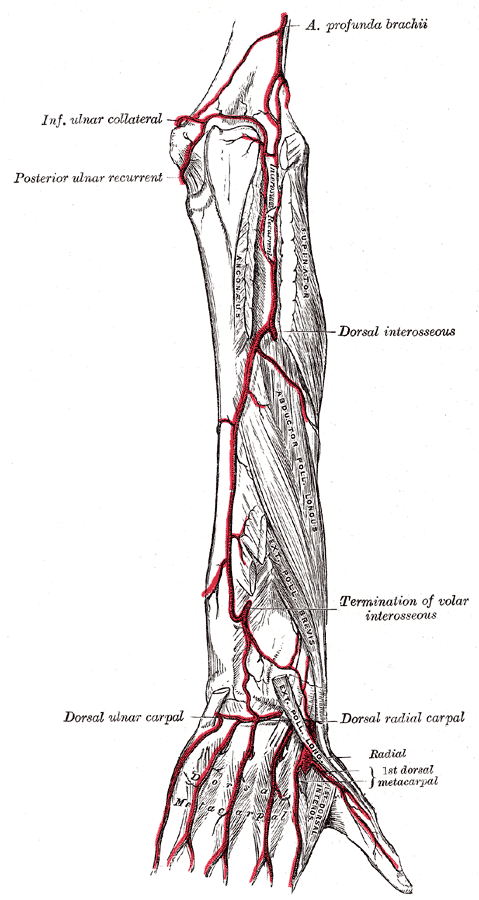
- Arteries of the back of the forearm and hand.

Details
- Source: Ulnar artery
- Branches: Dorsal carpal arch

Identifiers
- Latin: ramus carpalis dorsalis arteriae ulnaris
- TA98: A12.2.09.053
- TA2: 4668
- FMA: 22820

The dorsal carpal branch of the ulnar artery arises from the ulnar artery immediately above the pisiform bone, and winds backward beneath the tendon of the flexor carpi ulnaris; it passes across the dorsal surface of the carpus beneath the extensor tendons, to anastomose with a corresponding branch of the radial artery.

Immediately after its origin, it gives off a small branch, which runs along the ulnar side of the fifth metacarpal bone, and supplies the ulnar side of the dorsal surface of the little finger.
