= Volar arteries =

Volar arteries may refer to:

- Common volar digital arteries
- Deep volar branch of ulnar artery
- Proper volar digital arteries
- Superficial volar branch of radial artery
- Radial artery of index finger, also known as arteria volaris indicis radialis
- Volar carpal branch of ulnar artery
- Volar interosseous artery
- Volar metacarpal arteries
