= Carpal arch =

Carpal arch may refer to:

- Dorsal carpal arch
- Palmar carpal arch
  - Deep palmar arch
  - Superficial palmar arch
