= Palmar venous arch =

Palmar venous arch may refer to:

- Deep venous palmar arch
- Superficial venous palmar arch
