= Palmar digital arteries =

Palmar digital arteries may refer to:

- Common palmar digital arteries
- Proper palmar digital arteries
