= Palmar veins =

Palmar veins refers to:

- Palmar digital veins, veins found on the fingers
- Palmar metacarpal veins, veins found on the palm
