= Superficial palmar arch =

- Palm of right hand, showing position of skin creases and bones, and surface markings for the volar arches.

Details
- Source: Ulnar (primarily), Superficial palmar branch of the radial artery
- Branches: Common palmar digital
- Vein: Superficial palmar venous arch

Identifiers
- Latin: arcus palmaris superficialis, arcus volaris superficialis
- TA98: A12.2.09.056
- TA2: 4671
- FMA: 22834

The superficial palmar arch is formed predominantly by the ulnar artery, with a contribution from the superficial palmar branch of the radial artery. However, in some individuals the contribution from the radial artery might be absent, and instead anastomoses with either the princeps pollicis artery, the radialis indicis artery, or the median artery, the former two of which are branches from the radial artery.

Alternative names for this arterial arch are: superficial volar arch, superficial ulnar arch, arcus palmaris superficialis, or arcus volaris superficialis.

The arch passes across the palm in a curve (Boeckel's line) with its convexity downward,

With the thumb fully extended, the superficial palmar arch would lie approximately 1 cm from a line drawn between the first web space to the hook of hamate (Kaplan's cardinal line). The superficial palmar arch extends more distally than the deep palmar arch. The connection between the deep and superficial palmar arterial arches is an example of anastomosis, and can be tested for using Allen's test.

Three common palmar digital arteries arise from the arch, proceeding down on the second, third, and fourth lumbrical muscles, respectively. They each receive a contribution from a palmar metacarpal artery. Near the level of the metacarpophalangeal joints, each common palmar digital artery divides into two proper palmar digital arteries.

Four digital branches arise from this palmar arch that supplies the medial/ulnar 3 1/2 fingers.

== See also ==
- Deep palmar arch
- Palmar carpal arch
- Dorsal carpal arch

== Additional images ==
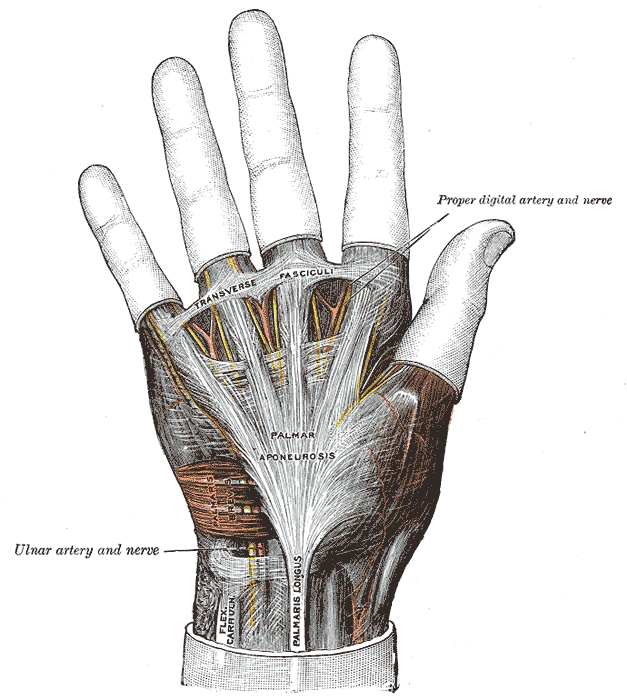
The palmar aponeurosis.

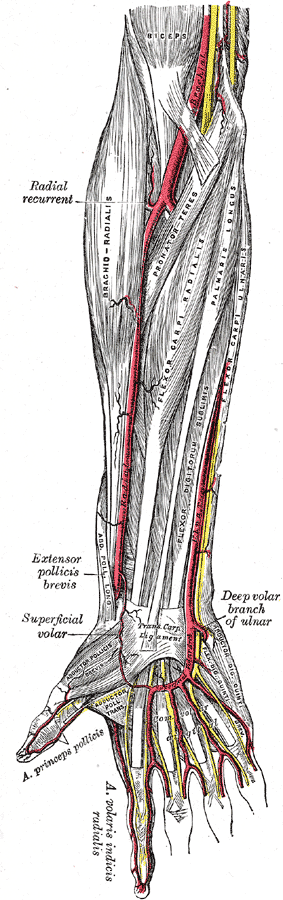
The radial and ulnar arteries.

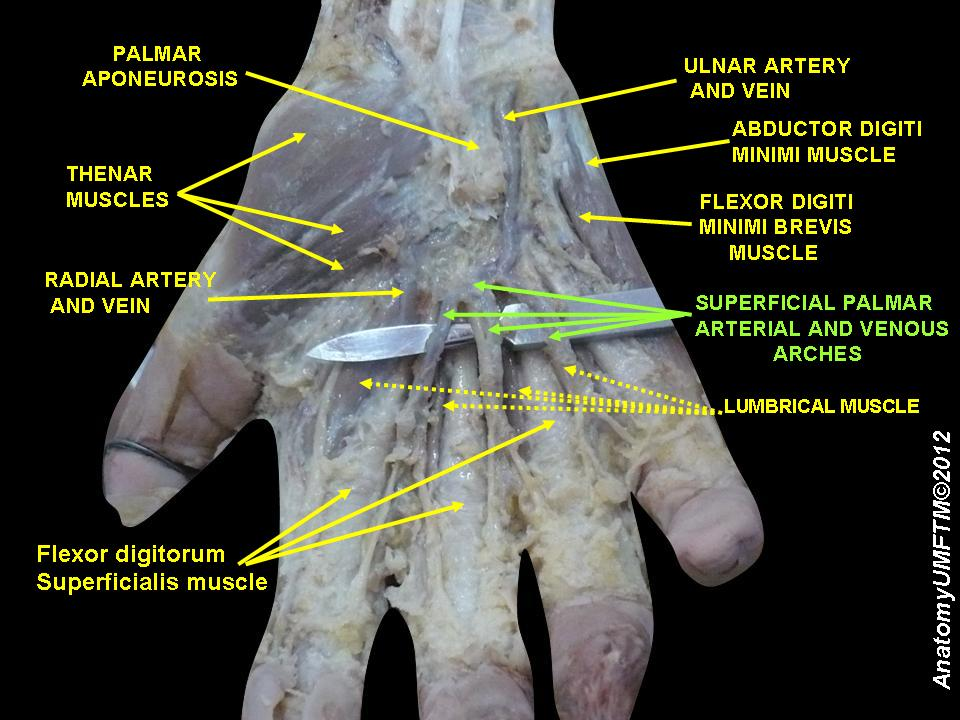
Superficial palmar arterial and venous arches

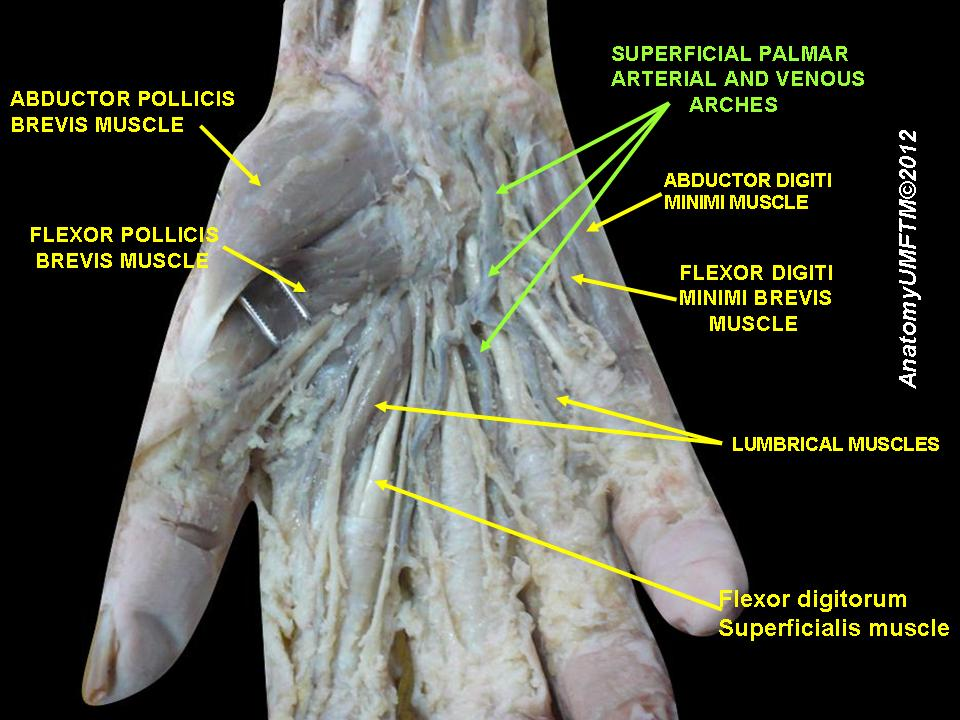
Superficial palmar arterial and venous arche

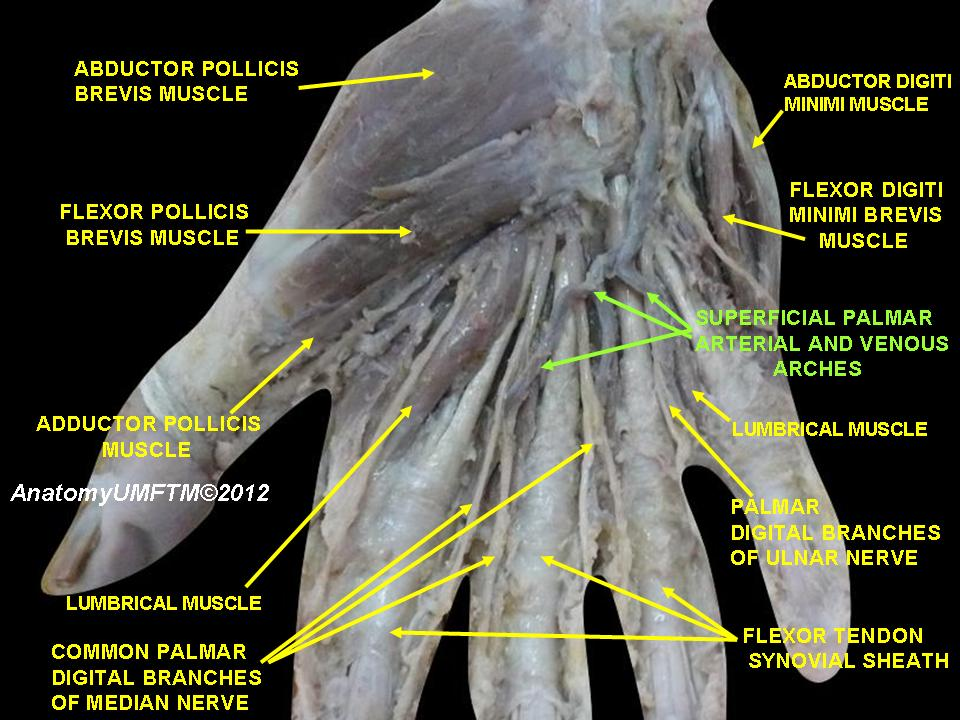
Superficial palmar arterial and venous arche

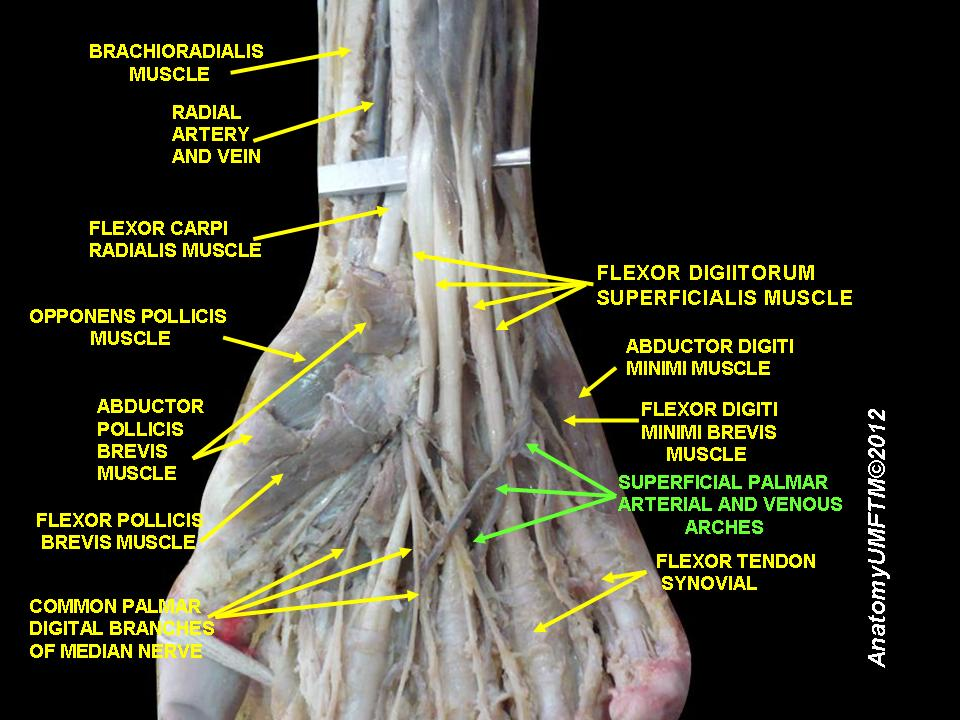
Superficial palmar arterial and venous arche

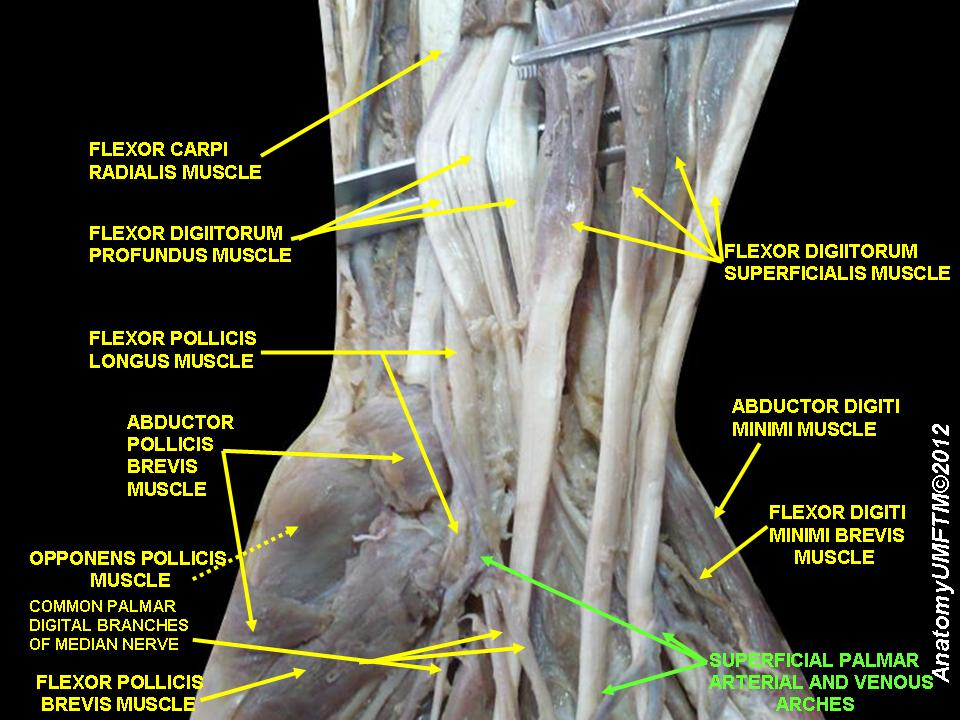
Superficial palmar arterial and venous arche

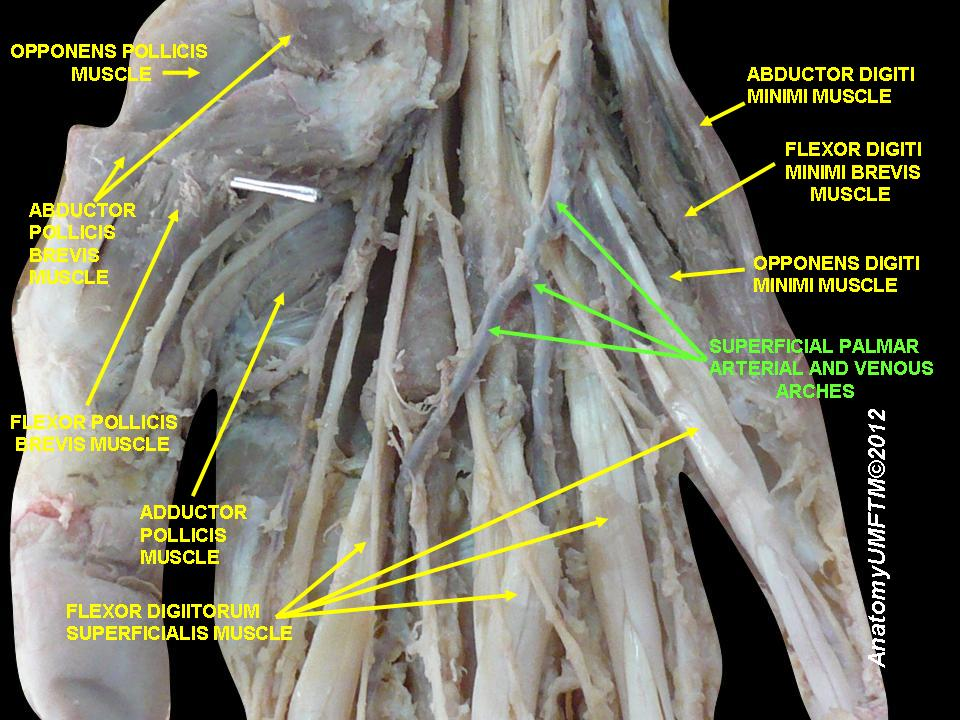
Superficial palmar arterial and venous arche

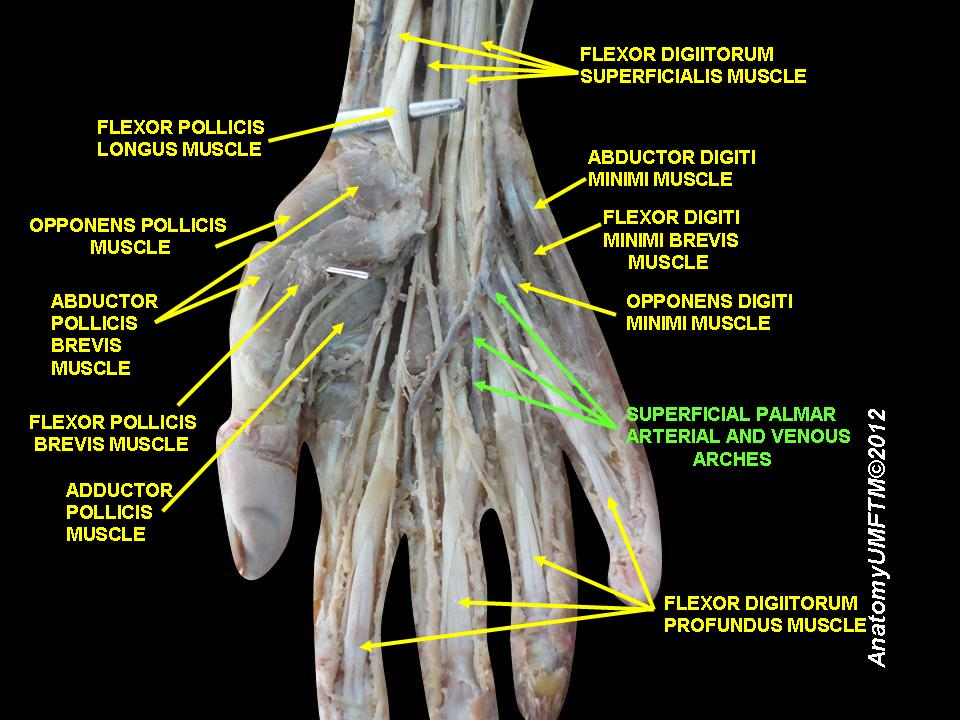
Superficial palmar arterial and venous arche
