= Palmar metacarpal arteries =

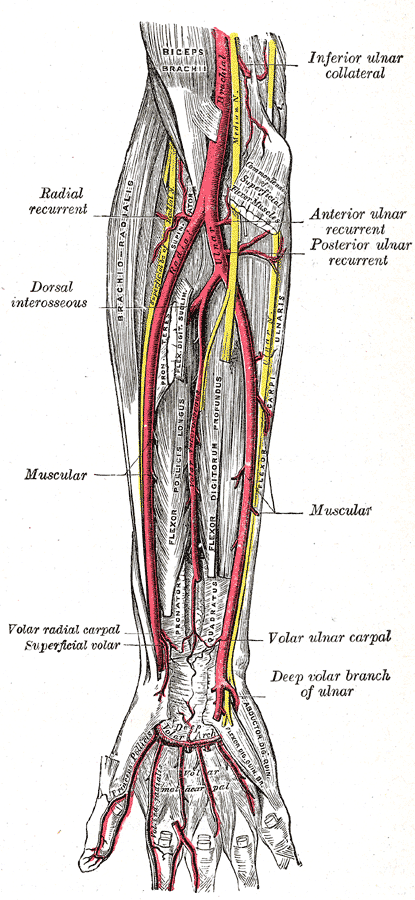
- Ulnar and radial arteries. Deep view (Volar metacarpal visible at bottom center).

Details
- Source: Deep palmar arch
- Vein: Palmar metacarpal veins

Identifiers
- Latin: arteriae metacarpales palmares, arteriae metacarpeae volares
- TA98: A12.2.09.039
- TA2: 4653
- FMA: 70802

The palmar metacarpal arteries (volar metacarpal arteries, palmar interosseous arteries) are three or four arteries that arise from the convexity of the deep palmar arch.

== Structure ==
The palmar metacarpal arteries arise from the convexity of the deep palmar arch.

They run distally upon the palmar interossei muscles. They anastomose at the clefts of the fingers with the common palmar digital arteries which arise from the superficial palmar arch.
