= Lumbricals of the hand =

Muscles in the central compartment of the hand

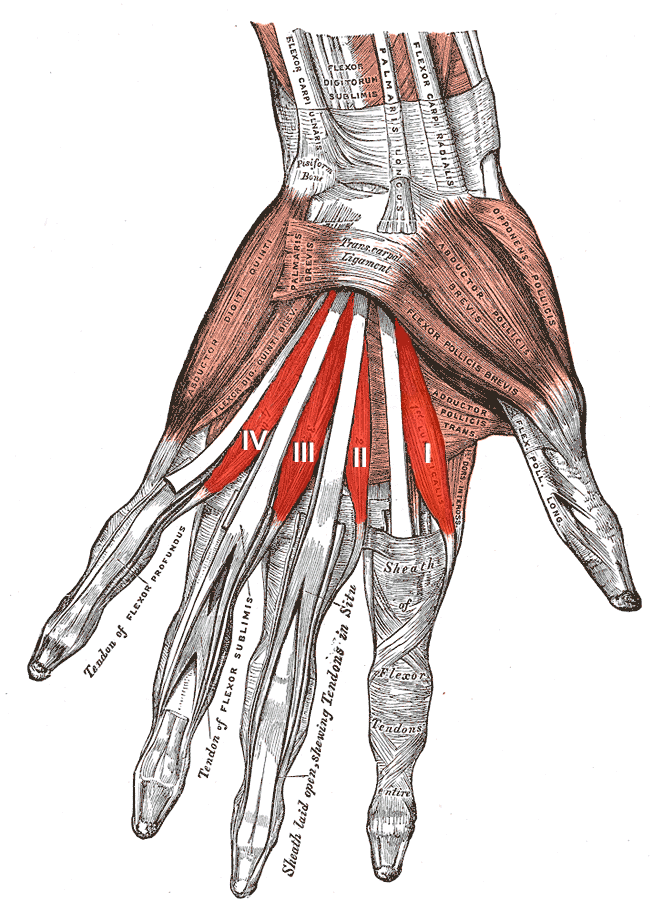
- The muscles of the left hand. Palmar surface. (first lumbricalis labeled at bottom right of muscular group)

Details
- Origin: Flexor digitorum profundus
- Insertion: Extensor expansion
- Artery: Superficial palmar arch, common palmar digital arteries, deep palmar arch, dorsal digital artery
- Nerve: Third and fourth deep branch of ulnar nerve, first and second median nerve
- Actions: Flex metacarpophalangeal joints, extend interphalangeal joints

Identifiers
- Latin: musculi lumbricales manus
- TA98: A04.6.02.065
- TA2: 2532
- FMA: 37385

The lumbricals are intrinsic muscles of the hand that flex the metacarpophalangeal joints, and extend the interphalangeal joints.

The lumbrical muscles of the foot also have a similar action, though they are of less clinical concern.

== Structure ==
The lumbricals are four, small, worm-like muscles on each hand. These muscles are unusual in that they do not attach to bone. Instead, they attach proximally to the radial side of the tendons of flexor digitorum profundus, and distally to the extensor expansions. The first and second lumbricals are unipennate, while the third and fourth lumbricals are bipennate.

#	Form	Origin	Insertion
First	unipennate	It originates from the radial side of the most radial tendon of the flexor digitorum profundus (corresponding to the index finger).	It passes posteriorly along the radial side of the index finger to insert on the extensor expansion near the metacarpophalangeal joint.
Second	unipennate	It originates from the radial side of the second most radial tendon of the flexor digitorum profundus (which corresponds to the middle finger).	It passes posteriorly along the radial side of the middle finger and inserts on the extensor expansion near the metacarpophalangeal joint.
Third	bipennate	One head originates on the radial side of the flexor digitorum profundus tendon corresponding to the ring finger, while the other originates on the ulnar side of the tendon for the middle finger.	The muscle passes posteriorly along the radial side of the ring finger to insert on its extensor expansion.
Fourth	bipennate	One head originates on the radial side of the flexor digitorum profundus tendon corresponding to the little finger, while the other originates on the ulnar side of the tendon for the ring finger.	The muscle passes posteriorly along the radial side of the little finger to insert on its extensor expansion.

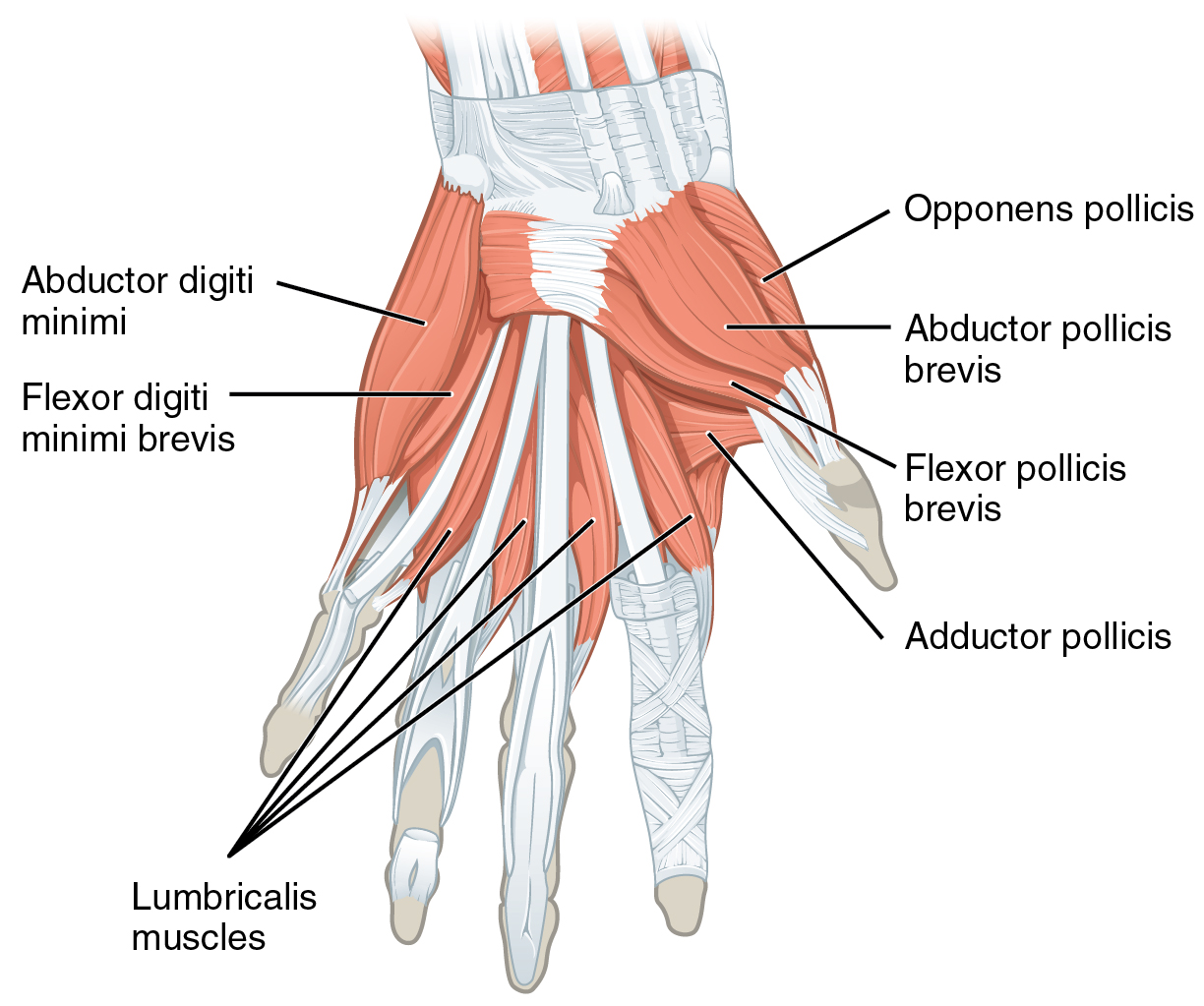
Lumbricals labeled at bottom left. Left hand, palmar view.

=== Nerve supply ===
The first and second lumbricals (the most radial two) are innervated by the median nerve. The third and fourth lumbricals (most ulnar two) are innervated by the deep branch of ulnar nerve.

This is the usual innervation of the lumbricals (occurring in 60% of individuals). However 1:3 (median:ulnar - 20% of individuals) and 3:1 (median:ulnar - 20% of individuals) also exist. The lumbrical innervation always follows the innervation pattern of the associated muscle unit of flexor digitorum profundus (i.e. if the muscle units supplying the tendon to the middle finger are innervated by the median nerve, the second lumbrical will also be innervated by the median nerve).

=== Blood supply ===
Four separate sources supply blood to these muscles: the superficial palmar arch, the common palmar digital artery, the deep palmar arch, and the dorsal digital artery.

== Function ==
The lumbrical muscles, with the help of the interosseous muscles, simultaneously flex the metacarpophalangeal joints while extending both interphalangeal joints of the digit on which it inserts. The lumbricals are used during an upstroke in writing.

== Etymology ==
The term "lumbrical" comes from the Latin, meaning "worm".

== Additional images ==
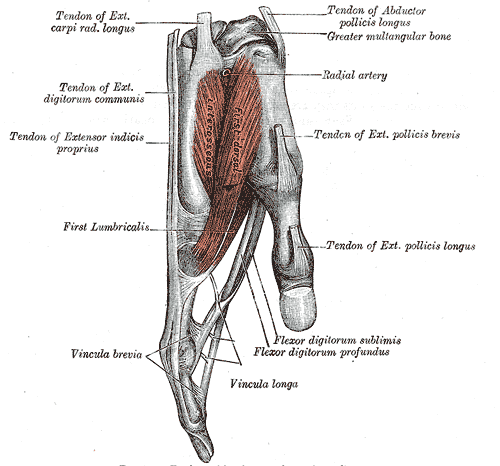
Tendons of forefinger and vincula tendina

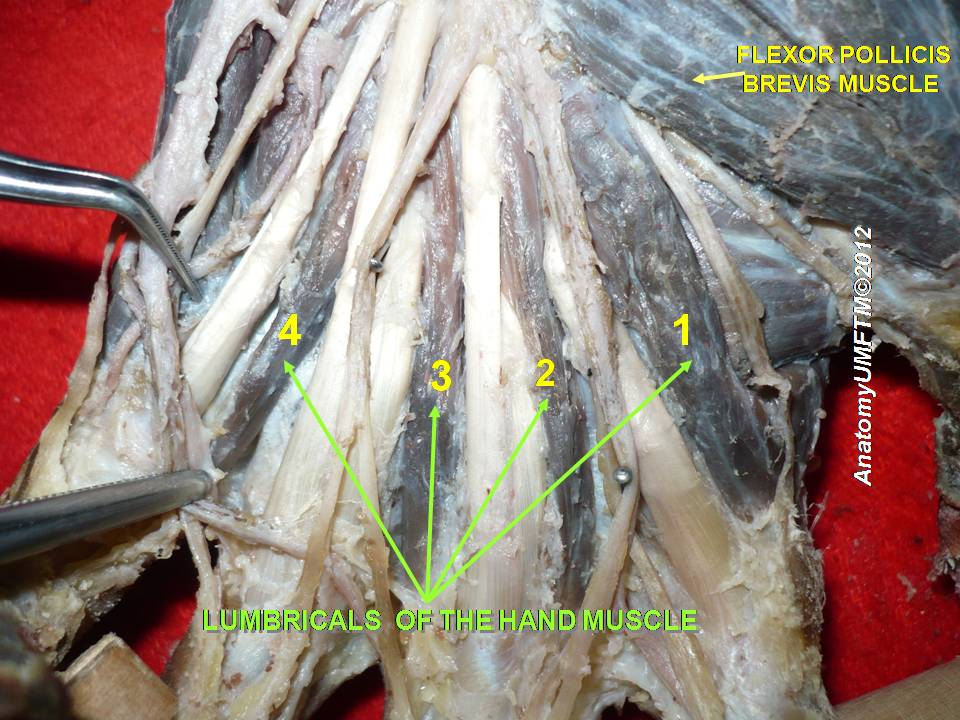
Lumbricals of the hand

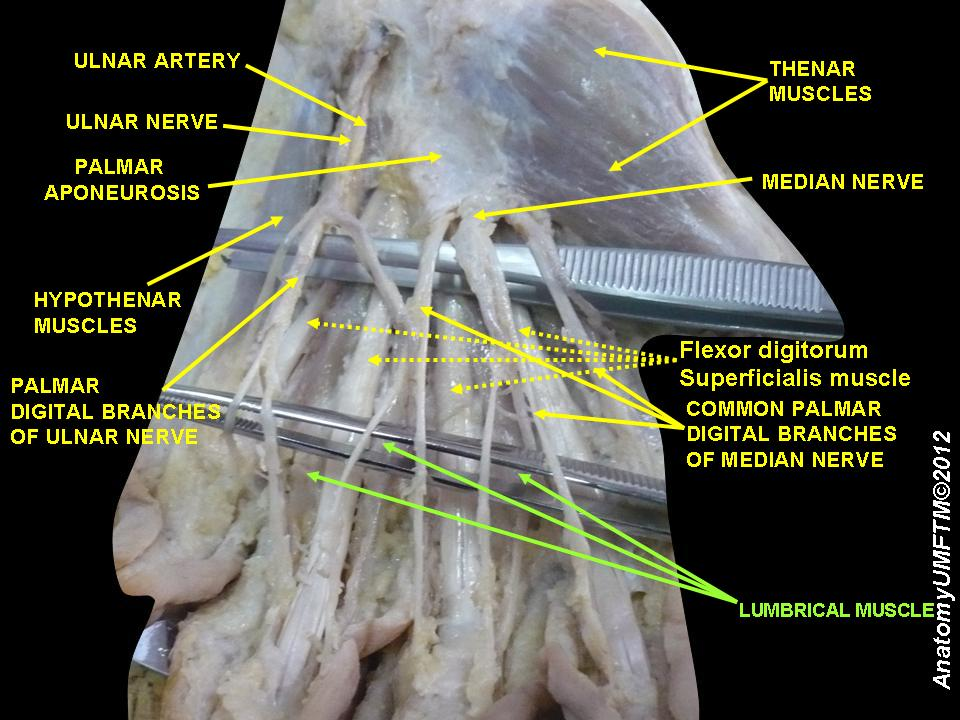
Lumbricals of the hand

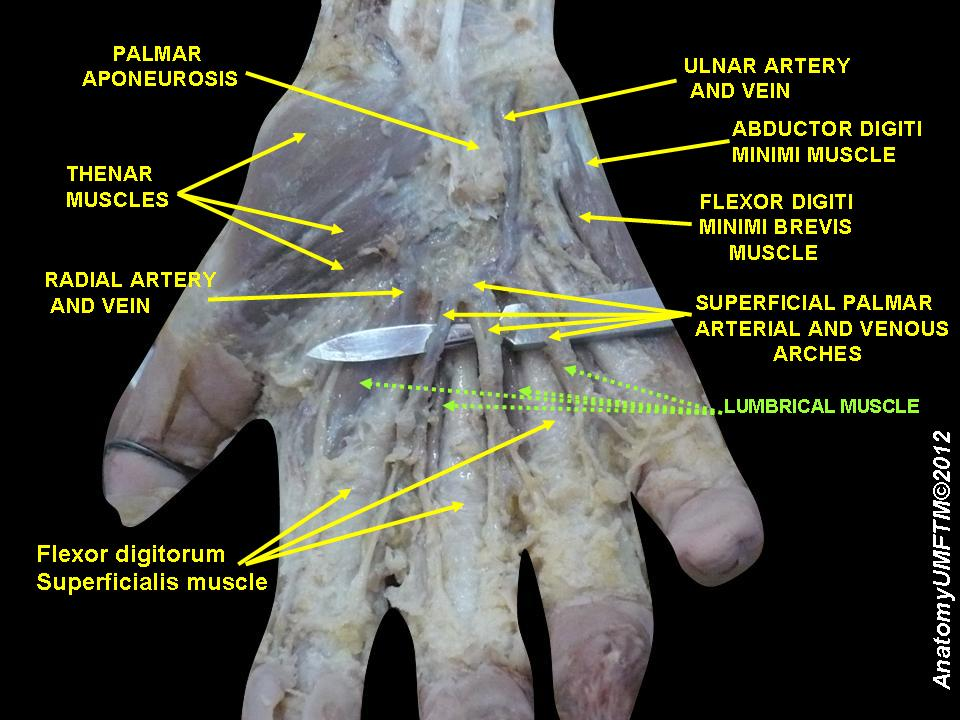
Lumbricals muscle

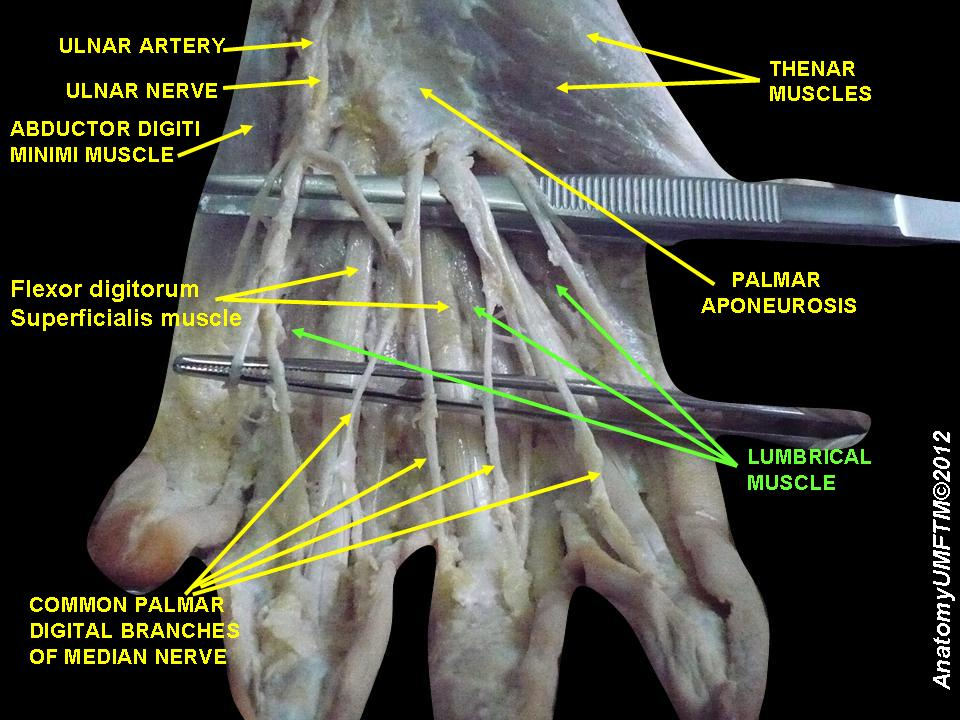
Lumbricals muscle

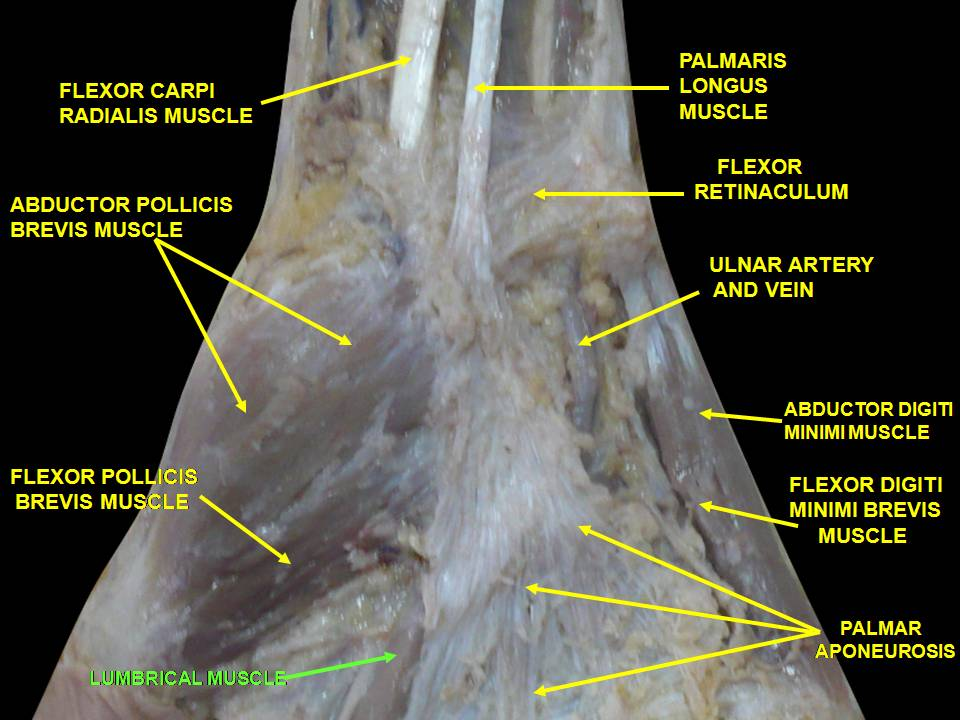
Lumbricals muscle

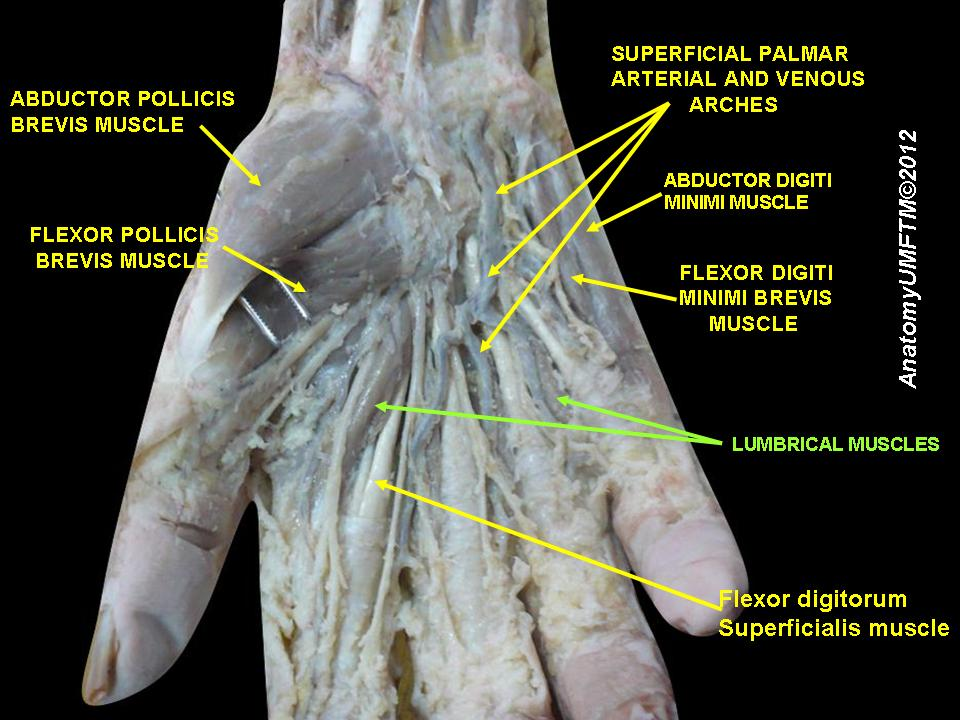
Lumbricals muscle

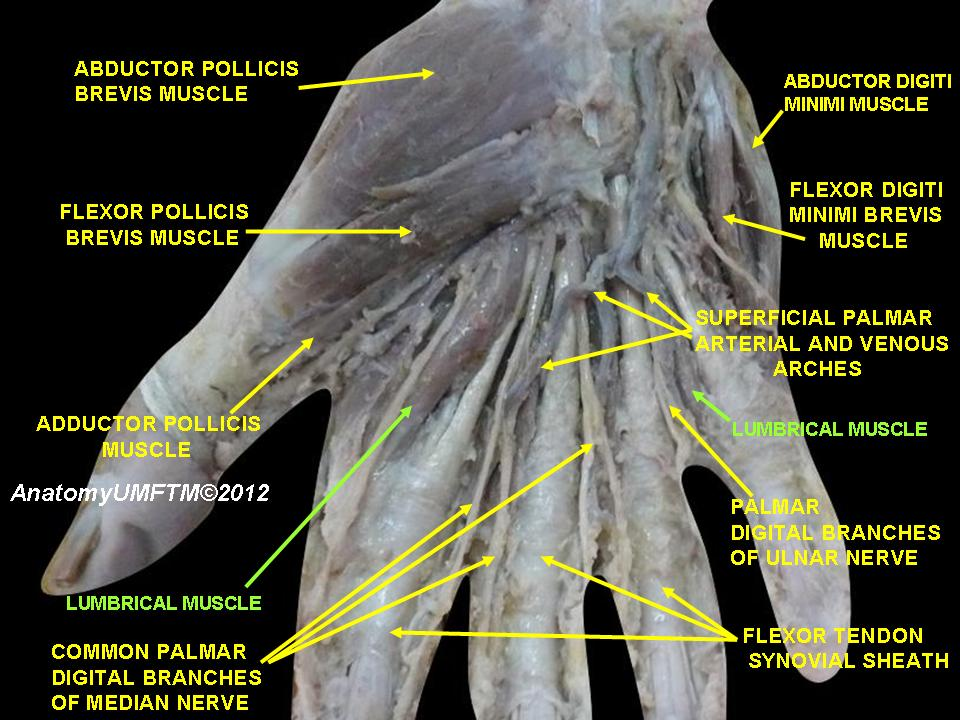
Lumbricals muscle

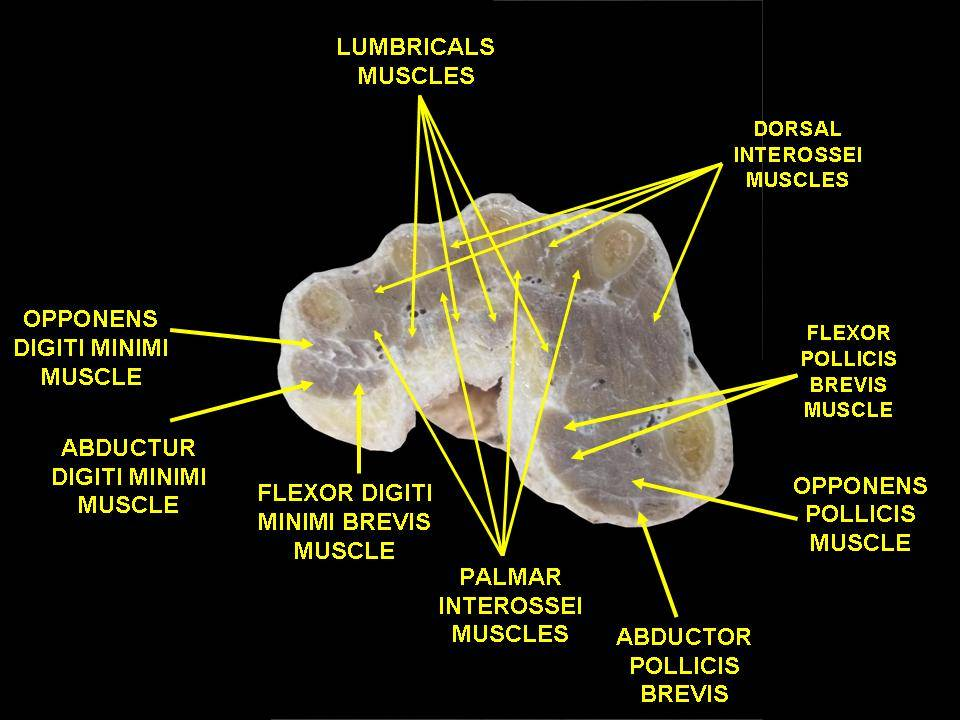
Muscles of hand, cross section

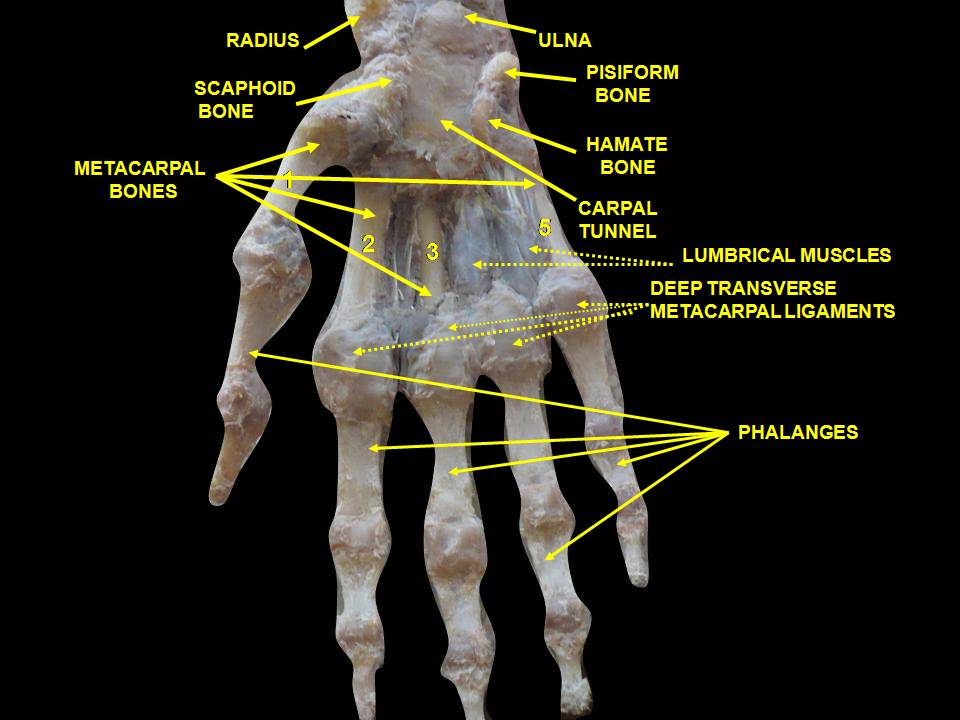
Wrist joint. Deep dissection. Anterior, palmar view

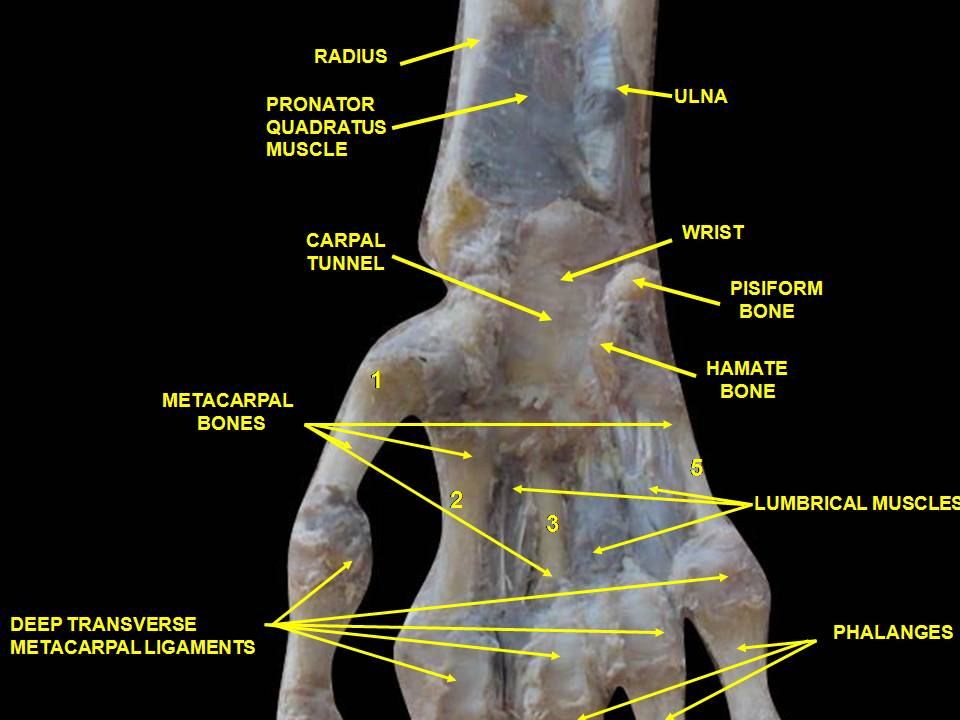
Wrist joint. Deep dissection. Anterior, palmar view

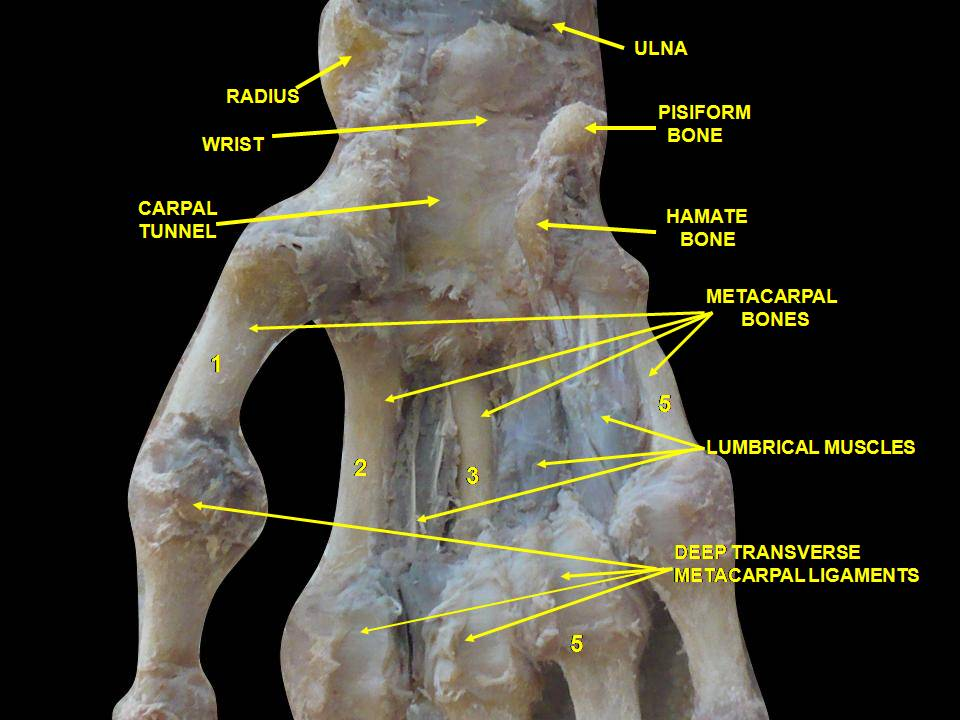
Wrist joint. Deep dissection. Anterior, palmar view
