= Palmar plate =

Ligament in finger and hand joints

- MCP joint in extension and in flexion, palmar plate in grey

Details

Identifiers
- Latin: ligamenta palmaria
- MeSH: D053401
- TA98: A03.5.11.603
- TA2: 1844
- FMA: 71410

In the human hand, palmar or volar plates (also referred to as palmar or volar ligaments) are found in the metacarpophalangeal (MCP) and interphalangeal (IP) joints, where they reinforce the joint capsules, enhance joint stability, and limit hyperextension. The plates of the MCP and IP joints are structurally and functionally similar, except that in the MCP joints they are interconnected by a deep transverse ligament. In the MCP joints, they also indirectly provide stability to the longitudinal palmar arches of the hand. The volar plate of the thumb MCP joint has a transverse longitudinal rectangular shape, shorter than those in the fingers.

== Structure ==
This fibrocartilaginous structure is attached to the volar base of the phalanx distal to the joint. From there, it forms a palmar continuation of the articular surface of the phalanx bone and its inner surface thus adds to the articular surface during extension.

In its proximal end, the volar plate becomes membranous and blends with the volar capsule which is attached to the head of the metacarpal bone. During flexion, the plate glides proximally down the volar surface of the metacarpal head. Its flexible attachment to the phalanx bone not only prevents it from restricting joint movements, but also prevents the long flexor tendons from being pinched in the joint. Flexion of the proximal phalanx is facilitated by the shape of the proximal edge, known as the volar recess, but this diaphanous end of the volar plate is also the part of the metacarpophalangeal joint that is most susceptible to injury during dislocations.

Due to its fibrocartilaginous composition, the plate is thus able to (1) resist tensile stresses while (2) restricting hyperextension and compression and (3) protecting the volar articular surface.

== Function ==
The palmar plate moves in three phases during joint flexion. First, it slides back toward the hand. Next, it is lifted away from the proximal phalanx by the A3 pulley. Last, a lip on the middle phalanx rolls into a recess on the plate. If the A3 pulley is not intact, the normal three phases of motion do not occur and instead the plate crumples.

== Metacarpophalangeal joints ==
In the MCP joints, the four volar plates of the fingers and the capsules within which they lie are blended with and interconnected by the deep transverse metacarpal ligament which ties the metacarpal heads together. Dorsal to this ligament on each side of the metacarpal heads are sagittal bands that connect the volar plates to the tendon of the extensor digitorum and to the extensor expansion. These bands help stabilise the volar plates over the metacarpal heads.

In contrast to the volar plates of the MCP joints of the fingers, the volar plate of the thumb MCP joint is a thick structure firmly attached to the base of the proximal phalanx. It forms the bottom of a two-sided box, the sides of which are made up of the collateral ligaments.

== Additional images ==
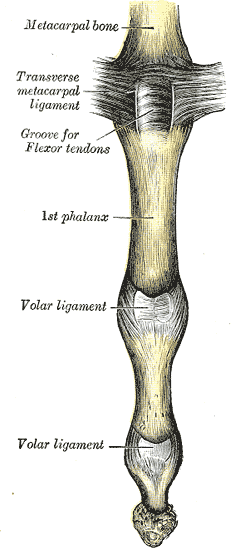
Metacarpophalangeal articulation and articulations of digit. Volar aspect.

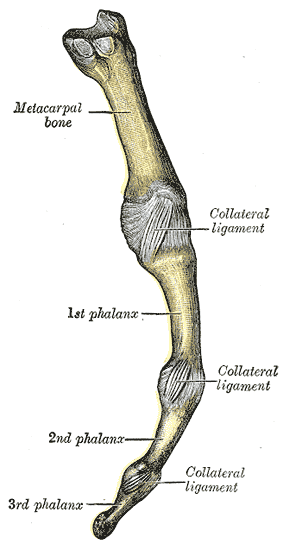
Metacarpophalangeal articulation and articulations of digit. Ulnar aspect.

== See also ==
- Annular ligaments of fingers
