= Flexor digitorum profundus muscle =

Forearm muscle that flexes the fingers

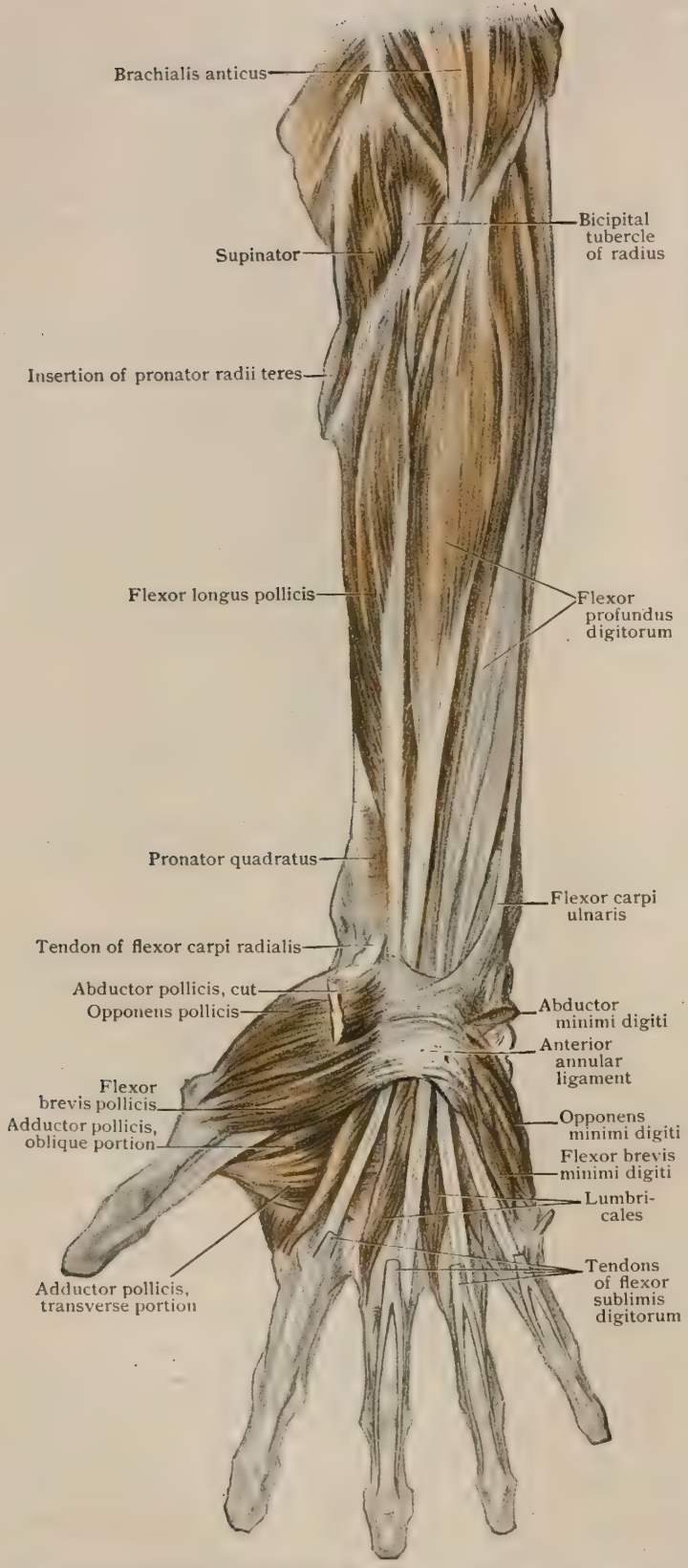
- Ventral view of the deep muscles of the right forearm. (From Piersol's Anatomy.)

Details
- Origin: Upper 3/4 of the anterior and medial surfaces of the body of the ulna, interosseous membrane and deep fascia of the forearm
- Insertion: Base of the distal phalanges of the fingers
- Artery: Anterior interosseous artery
- Nerve: Lateral part of the muscle by median (anterior interosseous), medial (ulnar) part of the muscle by muscular branches of ulnar
- Actions: Flex hand and both interphalangeal joints
- Antagonist: Extensor digitorum muscle

Identifiers
- Latin: musculus flexor digitorum profundus
- TA98: A04.6.02.036
- TA2: 2491
- FMA: 38478

The flexor digitorum profundus or flexor digitorum communis profundus is a muscle in the forearm of humans that flexes the fingers (also known as digits). It is considered an extrinsic hand muscle because it acts on the hand while its muscle belly is located in the forearm.

Together the flexor pollicis longus, pronator quadratus, and flexor digitorum profundus form the deep layer of ventral forearm muscles. The muscle is named from Latin 'deep bender of the fingers'.

== Structure ==
Flexor digitorum profundus originates in the upper 3/4 of the anterior and medial surfaces of the ulna, interosseous membrane and deep fascia of the forearm. The muscle fans out into four tendons (one to each of the second to fifth fingers) to the palmar base of the distal phalanx.

Along with the flexor digitorum superficialis, it has long tendons that run down the arm and through the carpal tunnel and attach to the palmar side of the phalanges of the fingers.

Flexor digitorum profundus lies deep to the superficialis, but it attaches more distally. Therefore, profundus's tendons go through the tendons of the superficialis at Camper's chiasm, and end up attaching to the distal phalanx. For this reason profundus is also called the perforating muscle.

The lumbricals of the hand arise from the radial side of its tendons.

=== Nerve supply ===
Flexor digitorum profundus is a composite muscle innervated by the anterior interosseous nerve and ulnar nerves.

- The medial aspect of the muscle (which flexes the 4th and 5th digit) is supplied by the ulnar nerve (C8, T1).
- The lateral aspect (which flexes the 2nd and 3rd digit) is innervated by the median nerve, specifically the anterior interosseous branch (C8, T1).

It is one of two flexor muscles that is not exclusively supplied by the median nerve (the other is flexor carpi ulnaris). In the forearm, the median nerve travels distally between the flexor digitorum superficialis and the flexor digitorum profundus.

=== Variation ===
The tendon of the index finger often has a separate muscle belly.

== Function ==
Flexor digitorum profundus is a flexor of the wrist (midcarpal), metacarpophalangeal and interphalangeal joints. The lumbricals, intrinsic muscles of the hand, attach to the tendon of flexor digitorum profundus. Thus, the flexor muscle is used to aid the lumbrical muscles in their role as extensors of the interphalangeal joints. As the lumbrical muscles originate on the palmar side of the hand and attach on the dorsal aponeurosis, power is transferred from the flexor digitorum profundus muscle to fully extend the fingers as well as flex the metacarpophalangeal joints.

The tension generated by flexor digitorum profundus at the more distal joints is determined by wrist position. Flexion of the wrist causes muscle shortening at that point, reducing tension that can be generated more distally. Fingers cannot be fully flexed if the wrist is fully flexed.

== Other animals ==
In many primates, the FDP is fused with the flexor pollicis longus (FPL). In great apes the belly of the FDP has a separate tendon for the FDP. In lesser apes, both muscles have separate bellies in the forearm, but in Old World monkeys they separate in the carpal tunnel. The lack of differentiation in the FDP musculature in baboons makes it unlikely that this monkey can control individual fingers independently.

== Additional images ==
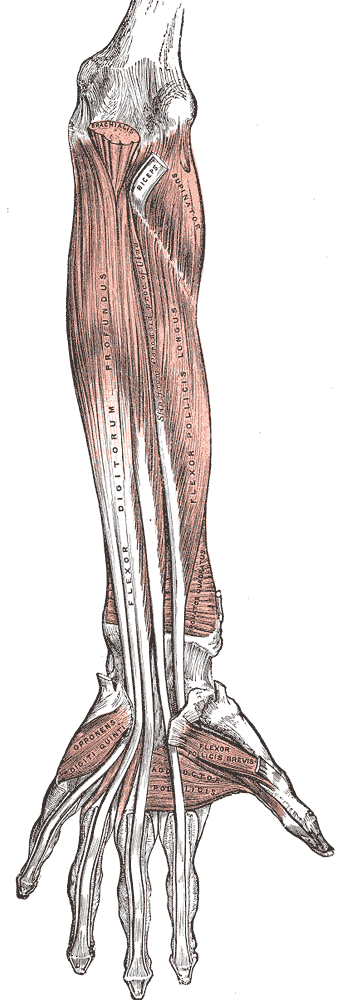
Front of the left forearm. Deep muscles.

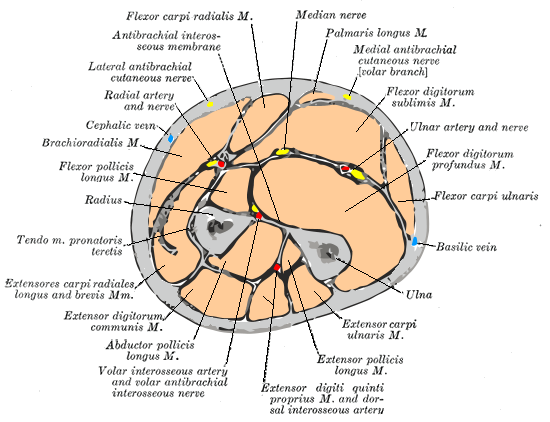
Cross-section through the middle of the forearm.

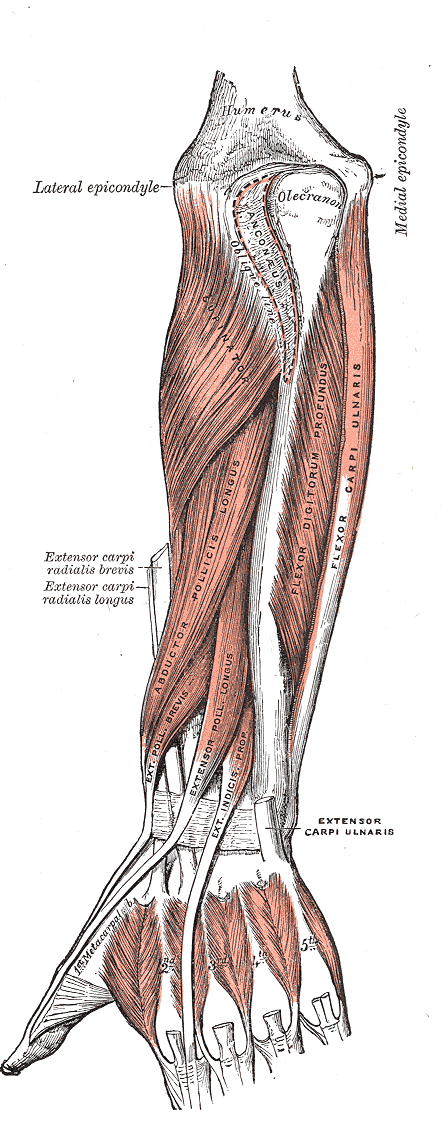
Posterior surface of the left forearm. Deep muscles.

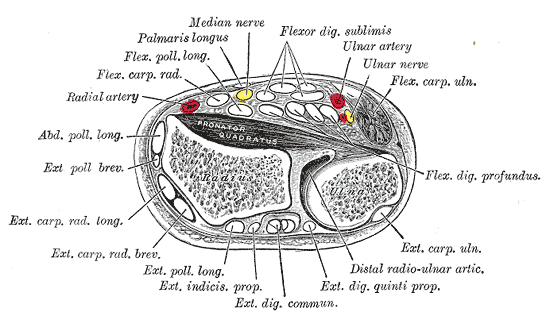
Transverse section across distal ends of radius and ulna.

Transverse section across the wrist and digits.

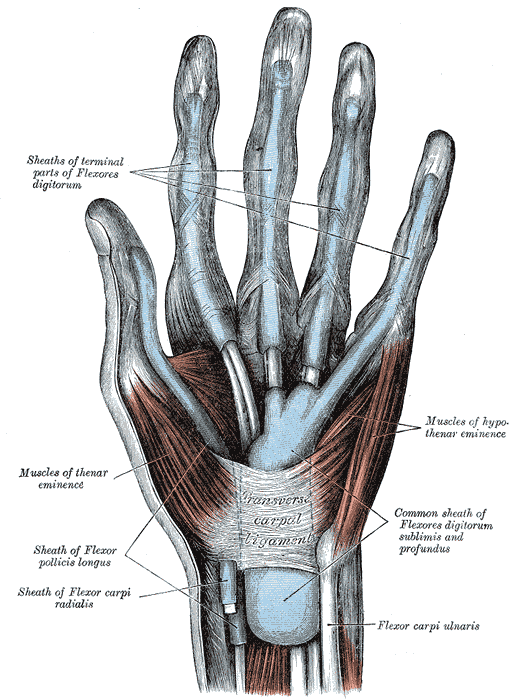
The mucous sheaths of the tendons on the front of the wrist and digits.

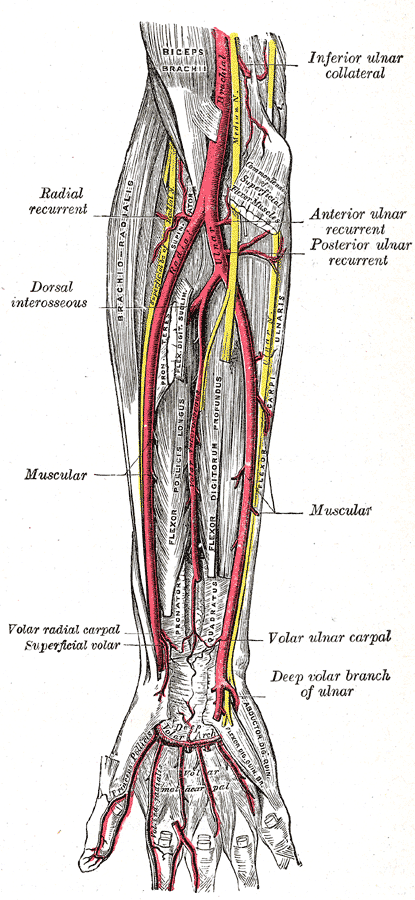
Ulnar and radial arteries. Deep view. Right upper limb.

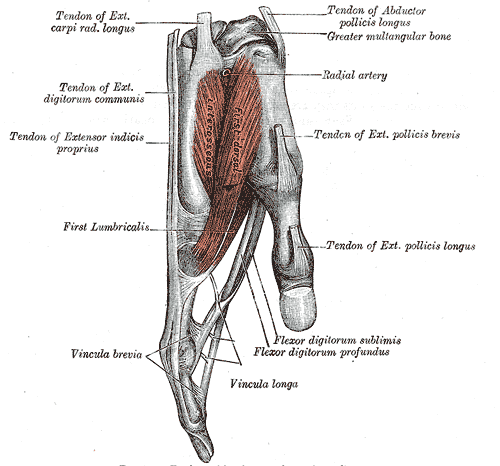
Tendons of forefinger and vincula tendina. (Flexor digitorum profundus labeled at bottom right.)

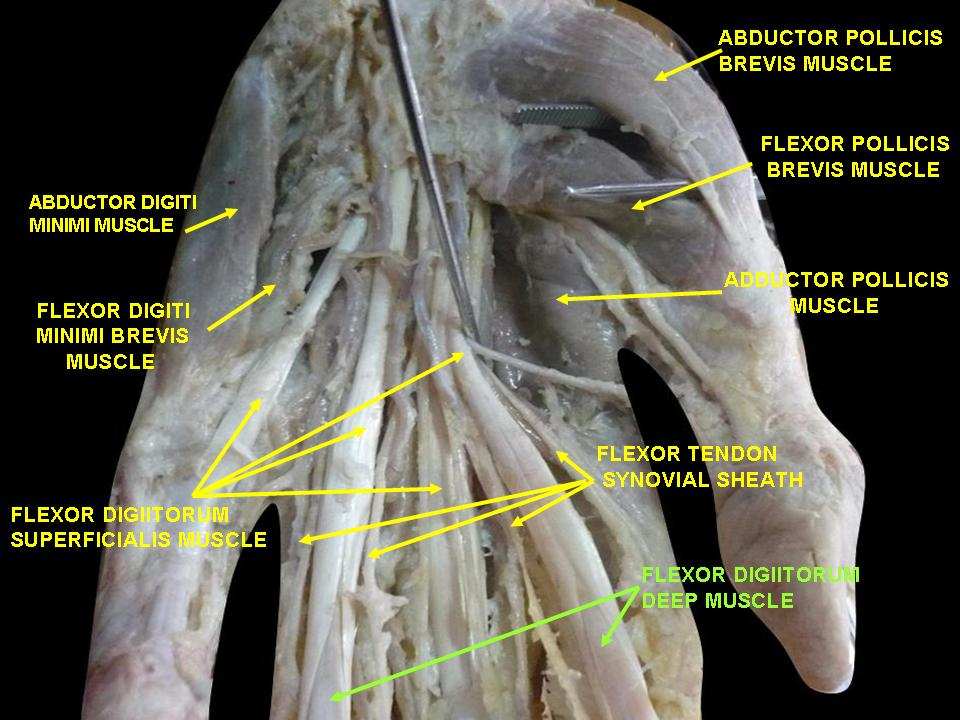
Flexor digitorum profundus muscle

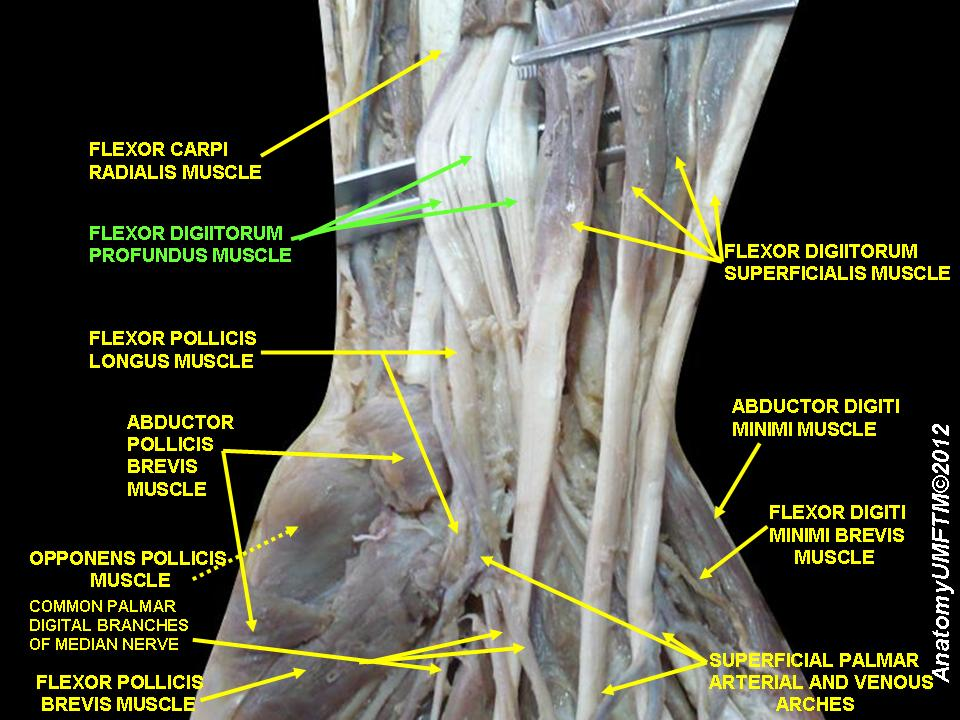
Flexor digitorum profundus muscle

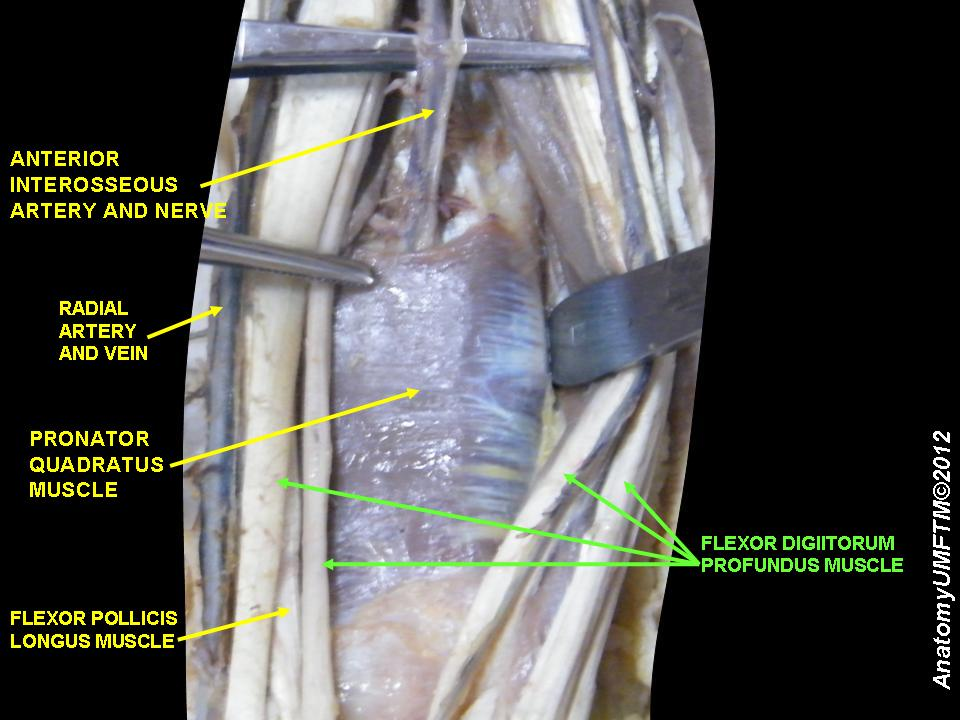
Flexor digitorum profundus muscle

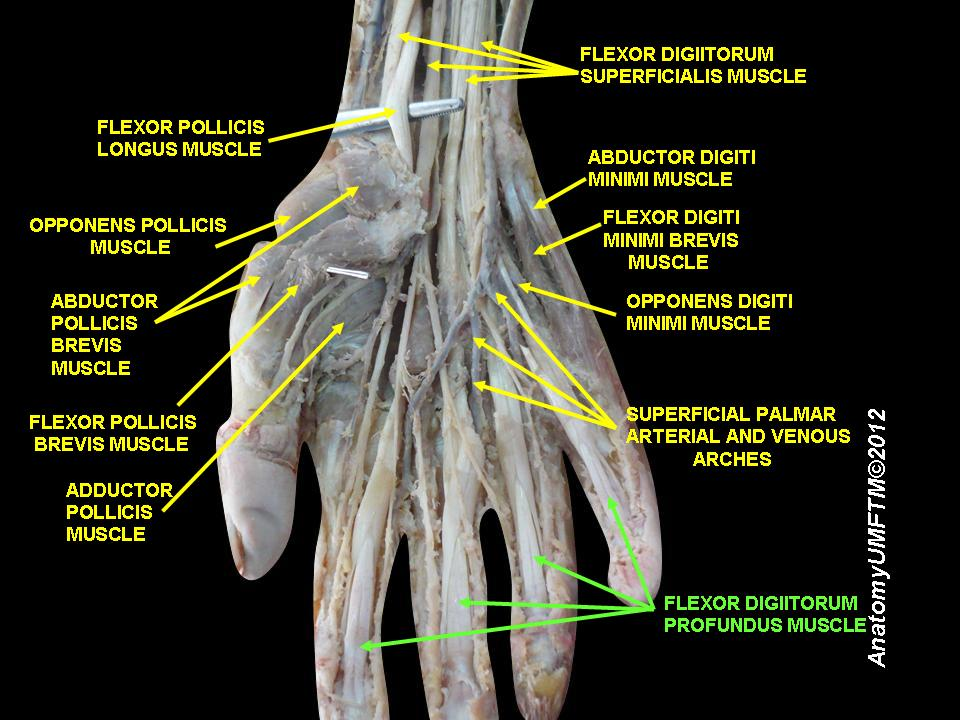
Flexor digitorum profundus muscle

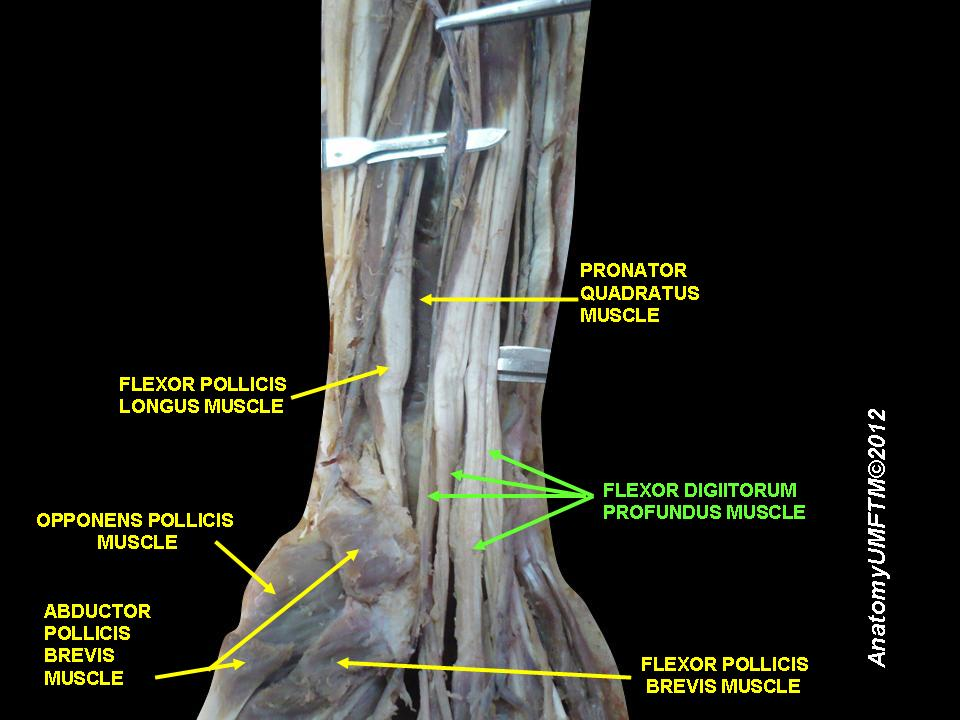
Flexor digitorum profundus muscle

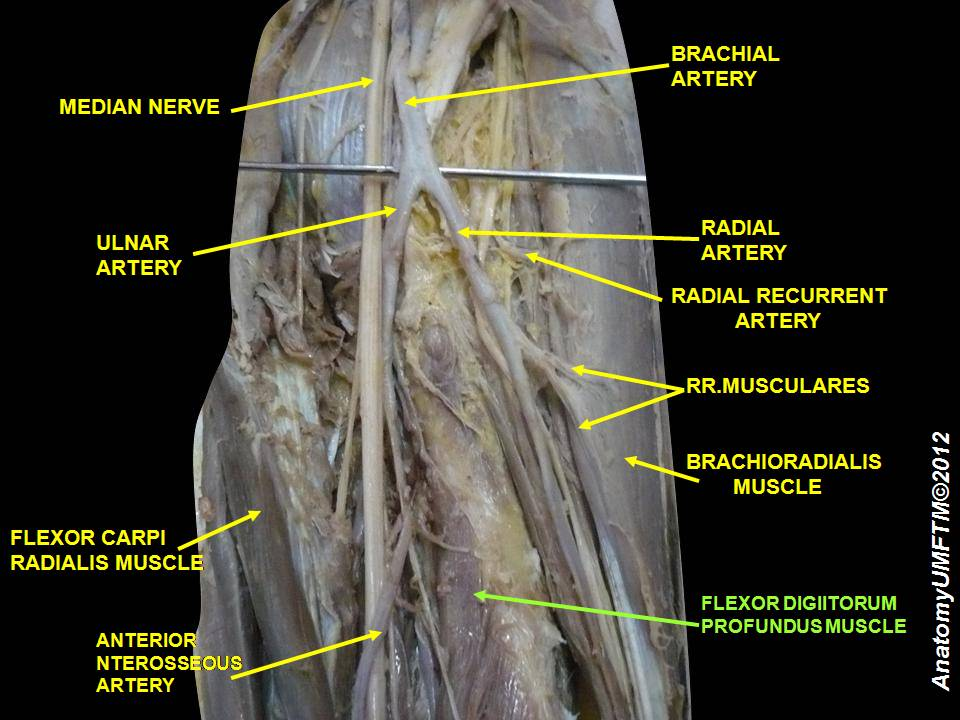
Flexor digitorum profundus muscle

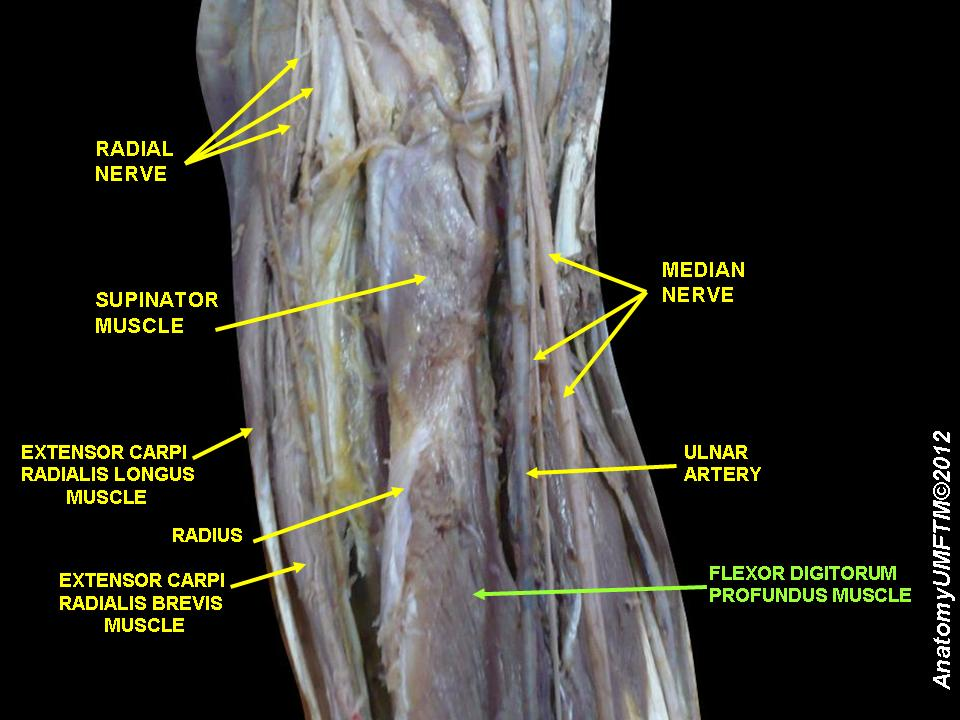
Flexor digitorum profundus muscle

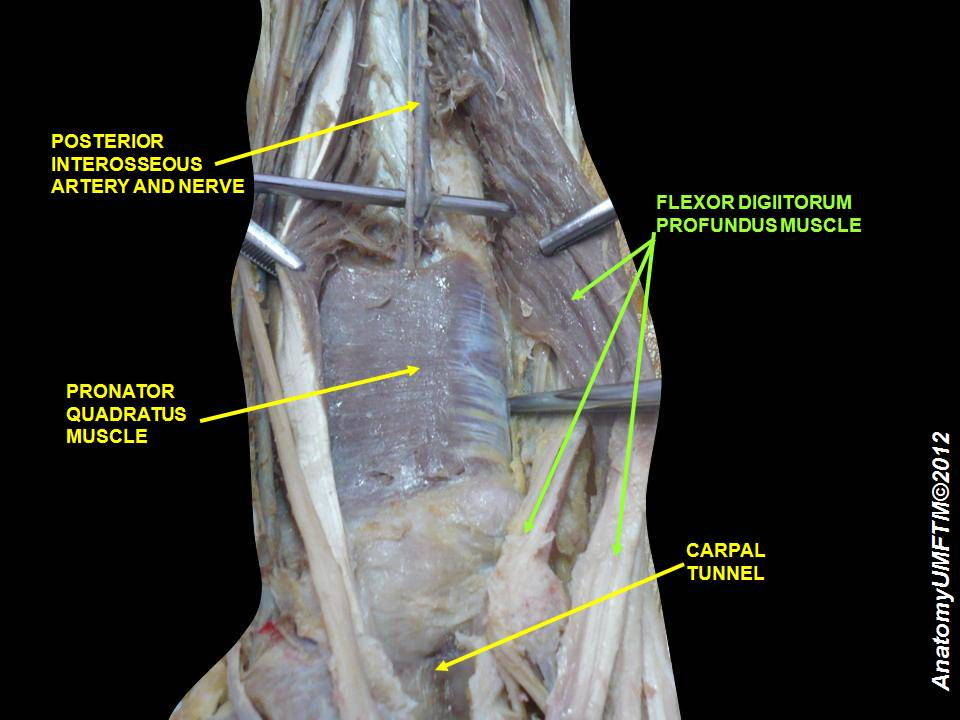
Flexor digitorum profundus muscle

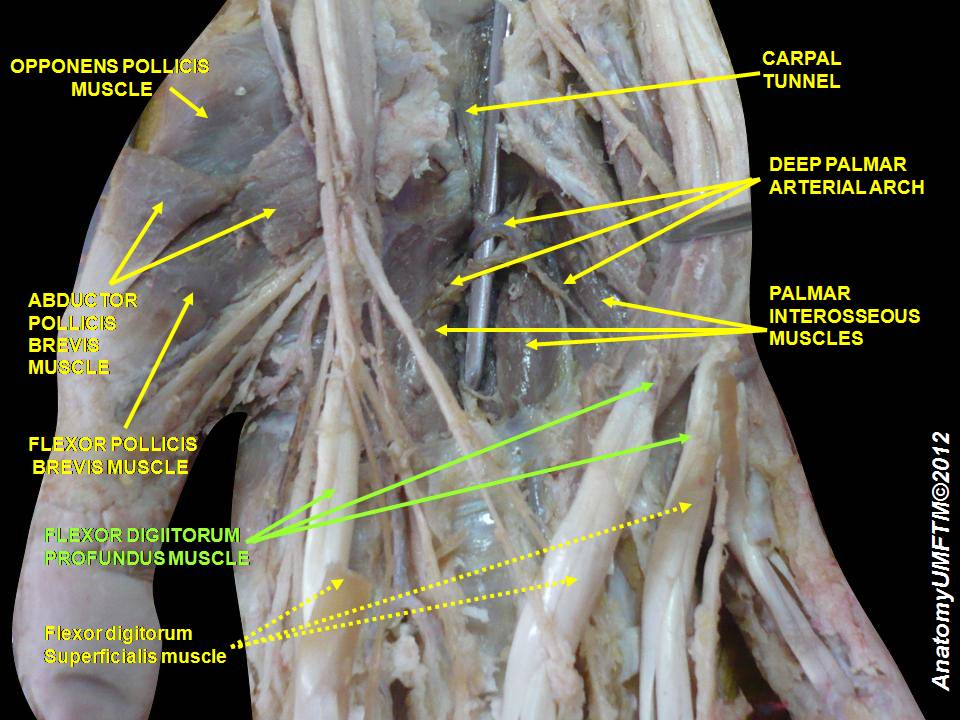
Flexor digitorum profundus muscle

== See also ==
- Jersey finger, a rupture of the tendon connecting to the muscle
- Flexor digitorum superficialis muscle
