= Palmar metacarpal veins =

Details
- Drains to: Deep palmar venous arch
- Artery: Palmar metacarpal arteries

Identifiers
- Latin: venae metacarpales palmares
- TA98: A12.3.08.035
- TA2: 4990
- FMA: 70903

The palmar metacarpal veins (or volar metacarpal veins) drain the metacarpal region of the palm, eventually draining into the deep veins of the arm.
