= Superficial palmar branch of radial artery =

Branch of an artery of the forarm

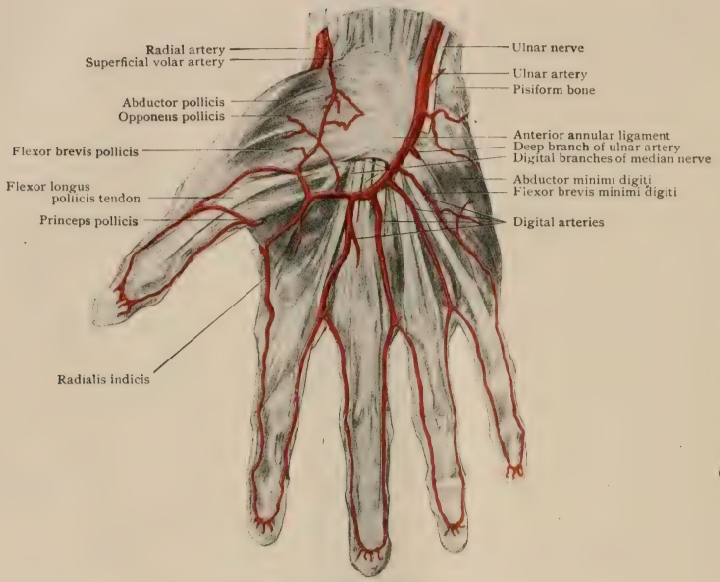
- Superficial palmar arch and its branches. Right upper limb. (After Piersol's Anatomy.)

Details
- Source: Radial artery
- Branches: Superficial palmar arch

Identifiers
- Latin: ramus palmaris superficialis arteriae radialis
- TA98: A12.2.09.031
- TA2: 4645
- FMA: 22752

The superficial palmar branch of the radial artery, also known as superficial volar artery, arises from the radial artery, just where this vessel is about to wind around the lateral side of the wrist.

Running forward, it passes over, seldom through, the thenar muscles, which it supplies, and usually terminates by inosculating with the terminal portion of the ulnar artery, completing the superficial palmar arch.

This vessel varies considerably in size: usually it is slender, and ends in the muscles of the thumb; sometimes it is as large as the continuation of the radial artery itself.
