= Deep venous palmar arch =

- Palm of left hand, showing position of skin creases and bones, and surface markings for the volar arches. (Deep palmar venous arch not visible, but diagram shows location of corresponding artery.)

Details
- Source: Palmar metacarpal veins
- Drains to: Radial vein
- Artery: Deep palmar arch

Identifiers
- Latin: arcus venosus palmaris profundus
- TA98: A12.3.08.034
- TA2: 4989
- FMA: 22911

The deep palmar arch, an arterial network is accompanied by a pair of venae comitantes which constitute the deep venous palmar arch. It receives the veins corresponding to the branches of the arterial arch: the palmar metacarpal veins.
