= Deep palmar arch =

Network of arteries in the palm

- Palm of left hand, showing position of skin creases and bones, and surface markings for the volar arches.

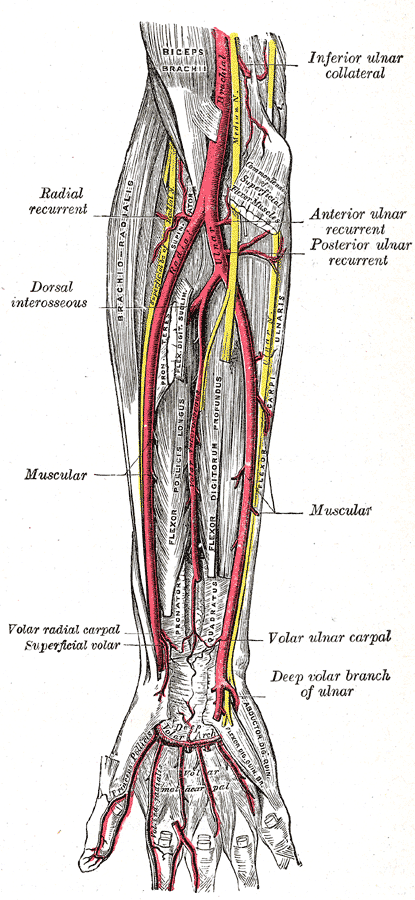
- Ulnar and radial arteries. Deep view. (Deep volar arch visible at bottom center.)

Details
- Source: Radial artery (primarily), deep palmar branch of ulnar artery
- Branches: Palmar metacarpal arteries
- Vein: Deep palmar venous arch

Identifiers
- Latin: arcus palmaris profundus, arcus volaris profundus
- TA98: A12.2.09.038
- TA2: 4652
- FMA: 22838

The deep palmar arch (deep volar arch) is an arterial network found in the palm. It is usually primarily formed from the terminal part of the radial artery. The ulnar artery also contributes through an anastomosis. This is in contrast to the superficial palmar arch, which is formed predominantly by the ulnar artery.

== Structure ==
The deep palmar arch is usually primarily formed from the radial artery. The ulnar artery also contributes through an anastomosis.

The deep palmar arch lies upon the bases of the metacarpal bones and on the interossei of the hand. It is deep to the oblique head of the adductor pollicis muscle, the flexor tendons of the fingers, and the lumbricals of the hand.

Alongside of it, but running in the opposite direction—toward the radial side of the hand—is the deep branch of the ulnar nerve.

The superficial palmar arch is more distally located than the deep palmar arch. If one were to fully extend the thumb and draw a line from the distal border of the thumb across the palm, this would be the level of the superficial palmar arch (Boeckel's line). The deep palmar arch is about a finger width proximal to this. The connection between the deep and superficial palmar arterial arches is an example of anastomosis. This anastomosis can be tested for using Allen's test.

The palmar metacarpal arteries arise from the deep palmar arch.

== Function ==
The deep palmar arch supplies the thumb and the lateral side of the index finger.

== See also ==
- Superficial palmar arch
- Palmar carpal arch
- Dorsal carpal arch

== Additional images ==
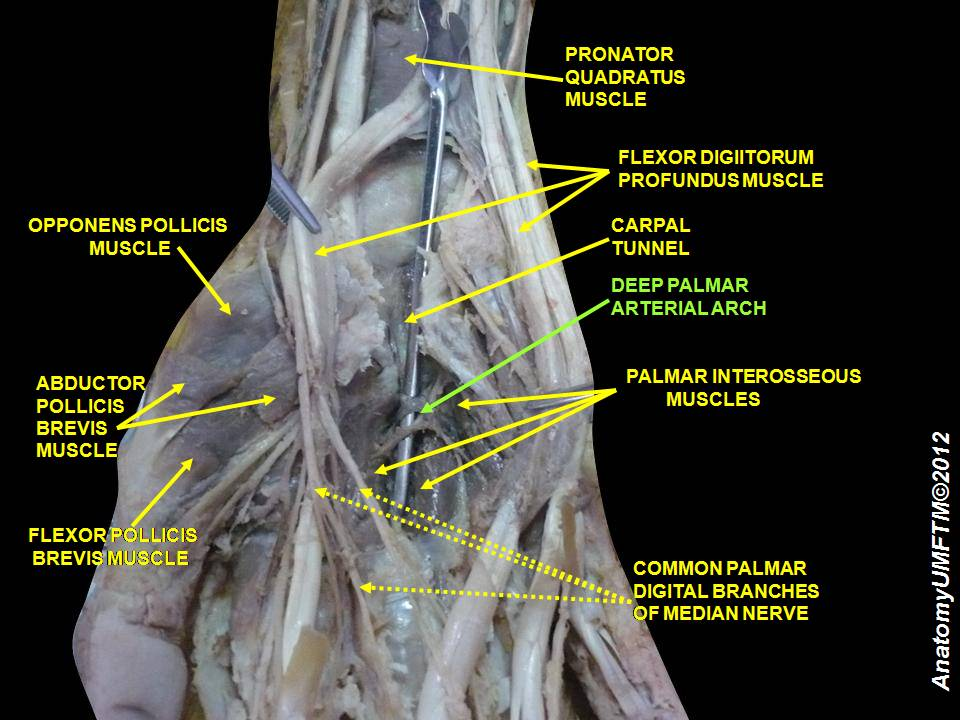
Deep palmar arterial arch

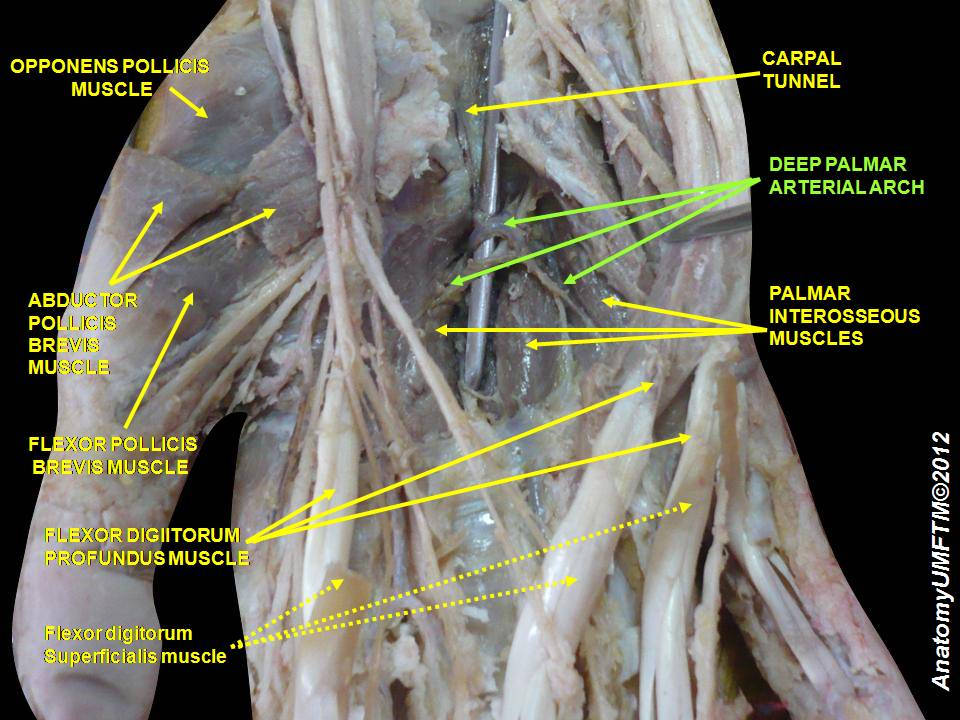
Deep palmar arterial arch
