= Deep palmar branch of ulnar artery =

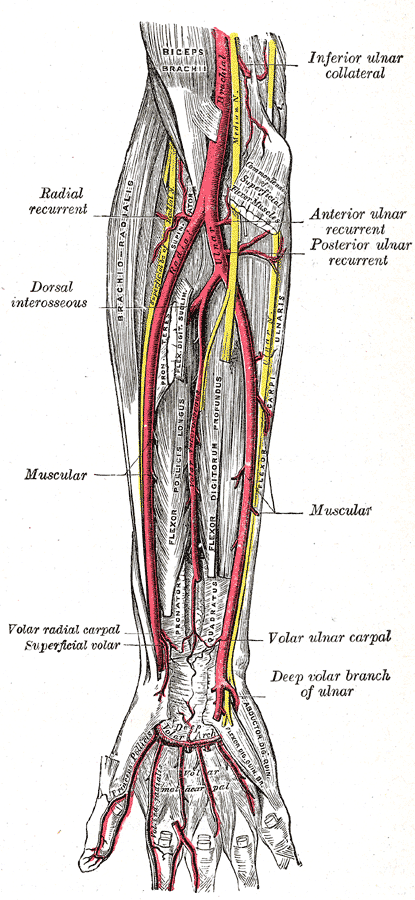
- Ulnar and radial arteries. Deep view. (Deep volar branch of ulnar labeled at bottom right.)

Details
- Source: ulnar artery
- Branches: deep palmar arch

Identifiers
- Latin: ramus palmaris profundus arteriae ulnaris
- TA98: A12.2.09.055
- TA2: 4670
- FMA: 22824

The deep palmar branch of ulnar artery (deep volar branch, profunda branch) passes between the Abductor digiti minimi and Flexor digiti minimi brevis and through the origin of the Opponens digiti minimi; it anastomoses with the radial artery, and completes the deep volar arch.

== See also ==
- Deep branch of ulnar nerve
