= Metacarpophalangeal joint =

Bodily joint at the base of each finger

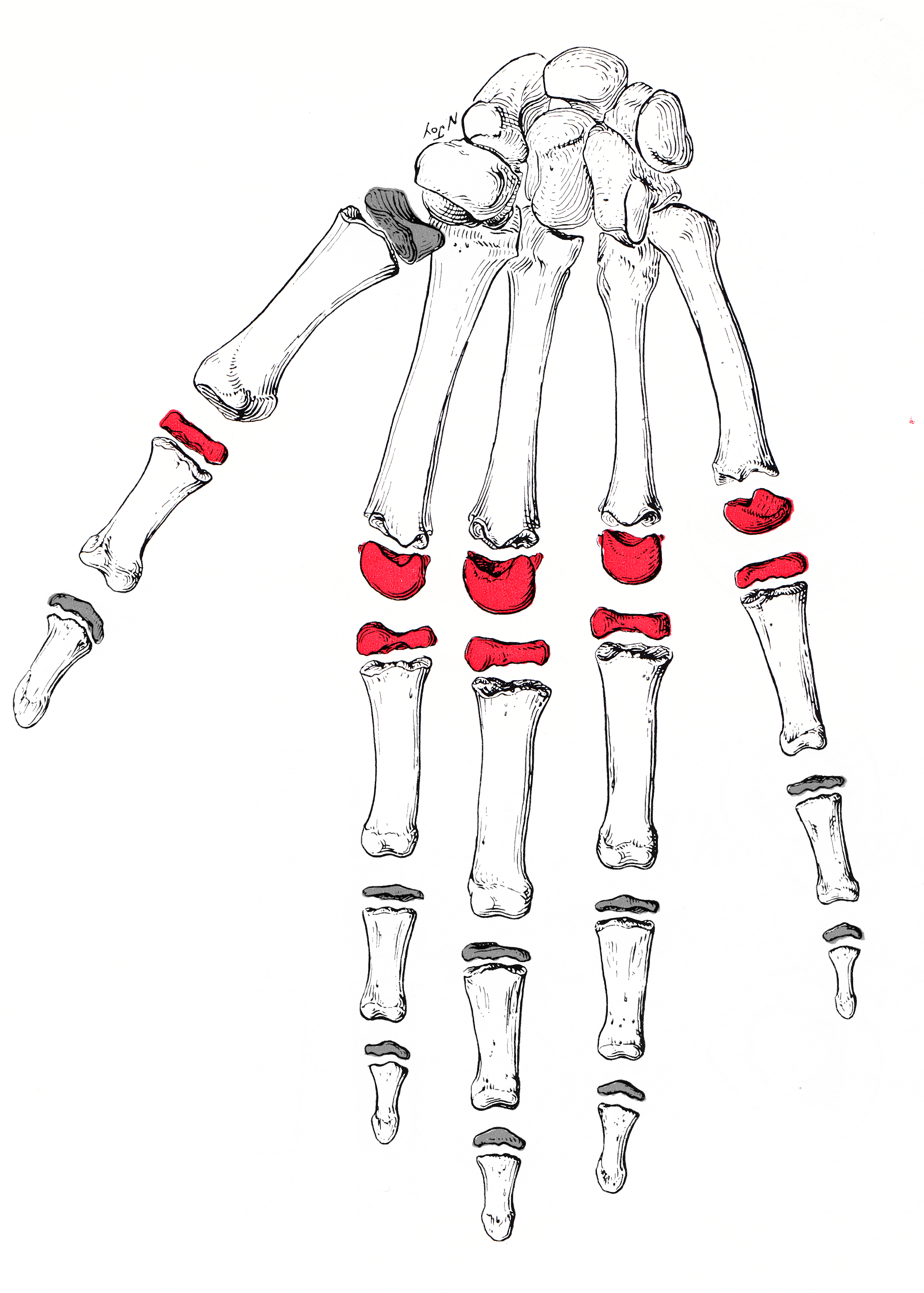
- The palmar aspect of the hand showing the epiphyses of the hand exploded. MCP joints in red.

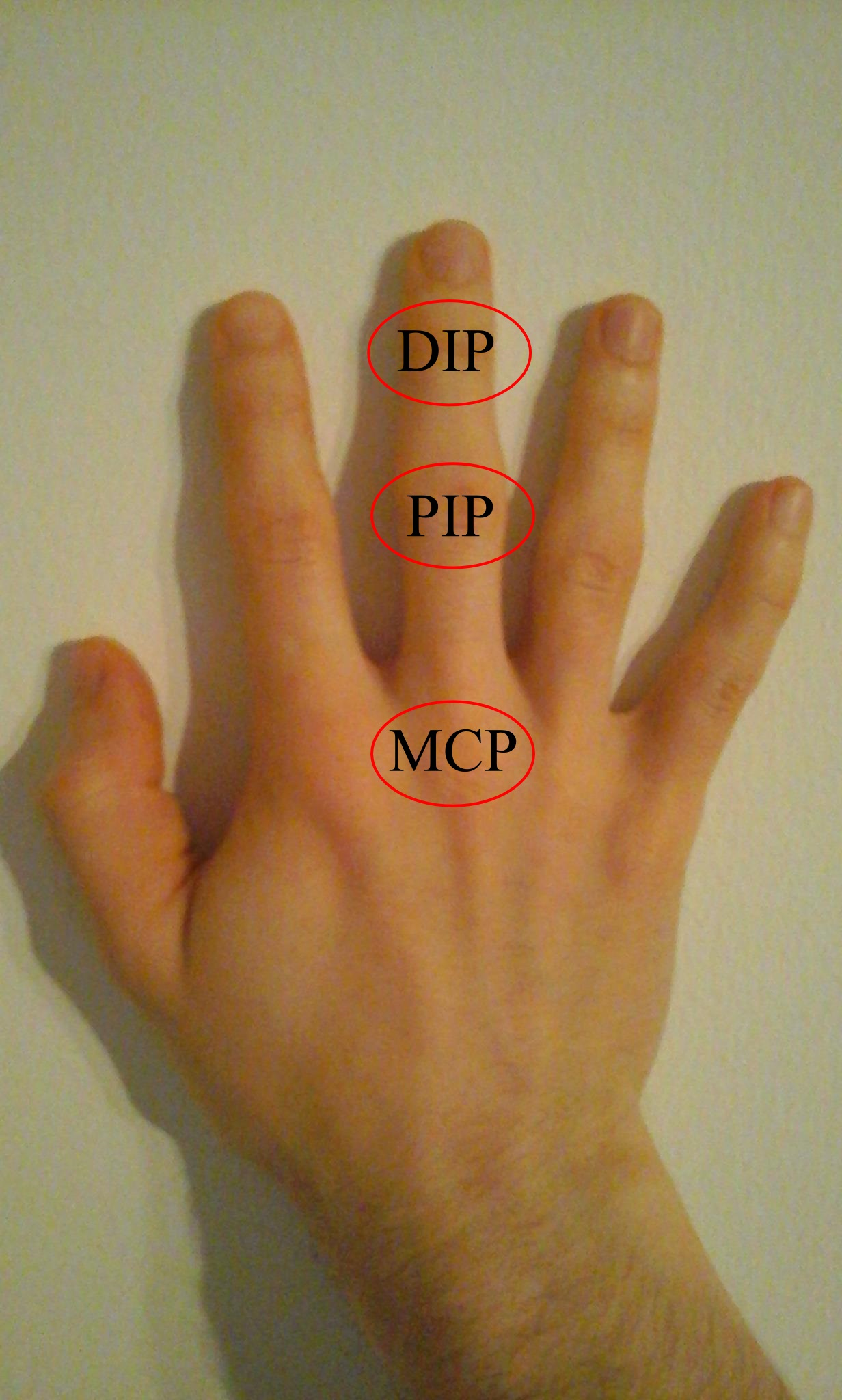
- The DIP, PIP and MCP joints of the hand: MetaCarpoPhalangeal joints, and the interphalangeal joints of the hand: Distal InterPhalangeal; Proximal InterPhalangeal

Details
- System: 099

Identifiers
- Latin: articulationes metacarpophalangeae
- MeSH: D008662
- TA98: A03.5.11.501
- TA2: 1835
- FMA: 35246

The metacarpophalangeal joints (MCP) are the joints in the knuckles of the hands that are situated between the metacarpal (palm) bones and the proximal phalanges (first bone of each finger). These joints are of the condyloid kind, formed by the reception of the rounded heads of the metacarpal bones into shallow cavities on the proximal ends (nearest the palm) of the proximal phalanges. Because they are condyloid, they allow joint movements of flexion (hand closing), extension (hand opening), abduction (spreading the fingers), adduction (squeezing together of the fingers) and circumduction (see anatomical terms of motion) at the joint.

== Structure ==
=== Ligaments ===
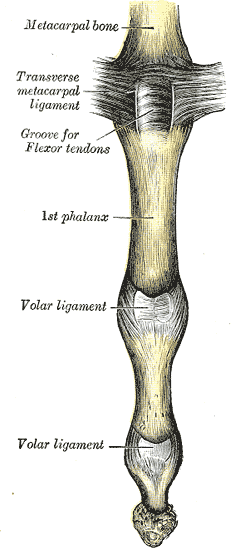
Metacarpophalangeal articulation and articulations of digit. Palmar aspect.

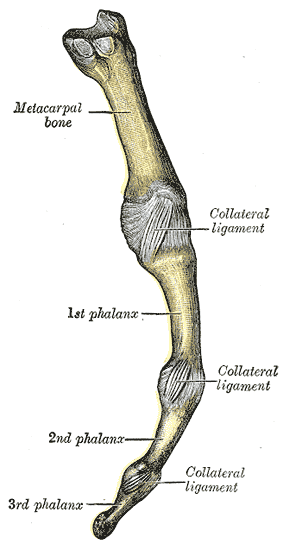
Metacarpophalangeal articulation and articulations of digit. Ulnar aspect.

Each joint has:

- palmar ligaments of metacarpophalangeal articulations
- collateral ligaments of metacarpophalangeal articulations

=== Dorsal surfaces ===
The dorsal surfaces of these joints are covered by the expansions of the Extensor tendons, together with some loose areolar tissue which connects the deep surfaces of the tendons to the bones.

== Function ==
The movements which occur in these joints are flexion, extension, adduction, abduction, and circumduction; the movements of abduction and adduction are very limited, and cannot be performed while the fingers form a fist.

The muscles of flexion and extension are as follows:

Location	Flexion	Extension
fingers	Flexor digitorum superficialis and profundus, lumbricals, and interossei, assisted in the case of the little finger by the flexor digiti minimi brevis	extensor digitorum communis, extensor indicis proprius, and extensor digiti minimi muscle
thumb	flexor pollicis longus and brevis	extensor pollicis longus and brevis

== Clinical significance ==
Arthritis of the MCP is a distinguishing feature of rheumatoid arthritis, as opposed to the distal interphalangeal joint in osteoarthritis.

=== Other animals ===
In many quadrupeds, particularly horses and other larger animals, the metacarpophalangeal joint is referred to as the "fetlock". This term is translated literally as "foot-lock". In fact, although the term fetlock does not specifically apply to other species' metacarpophalangeal joints (for instance, humans), the "second" or "mid-finger" knuckle of the human hand does anatomically correspond to the fetlock on larger quadrupeds. For lack of a better term, the shortened name may seem more practical.

== See also ==
- Knuckle
