= Common palmar digital arteries =

- Palmar view of the left hand, showing the common palmar digital arteries in context.

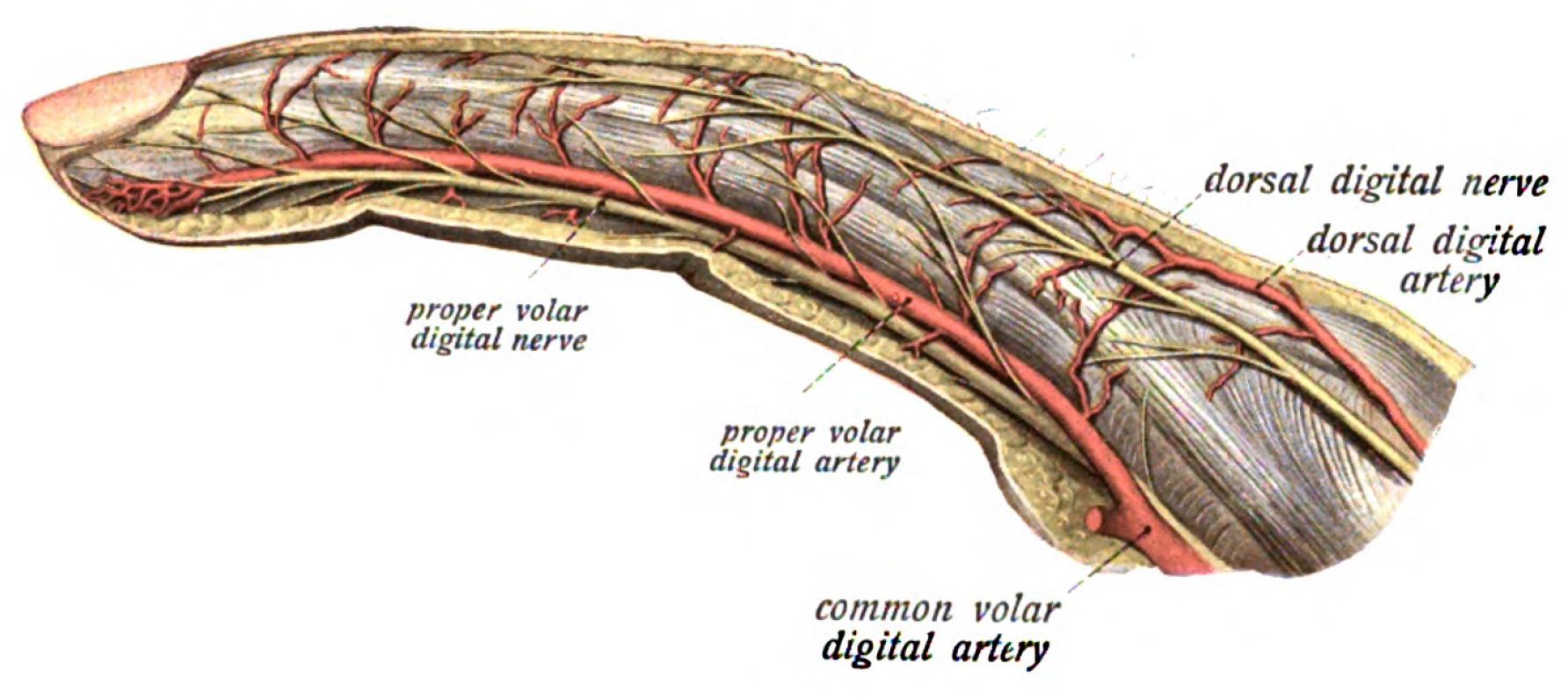
- Lateral aspect of finger, with artery labeled a common volar digital artery.

Details
- Source: Superficial palmar arch
- Branches: Proper palmar digital arteries
- Vein: Palmar digital veins

Identifiers
- Latin: arteriae digitales palmares communes, arteriae digitales volares communes
- TA98: A12.2.09.057
- TA2: 4672
- FMA: 22852

Three common palmar digital arteries arise from the convexity of the superficial palmar arch and proceed distally over the second, third, and fourth lumbricales muscles.

Alternative names for these arteries are: common volar digital arteries, ulnar metacarpal arteries, arteriae digitales palmares communes, or aa. digitales volares communes.

Each of these arteries receive the corresponding volar metacarpal artery and then divide into a pair of proper palmar digital arteries (q.v.).

== Additional images ==
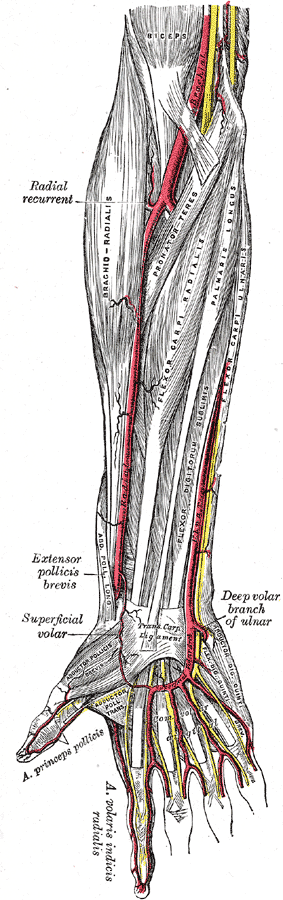
Muscles and arteries of the right forearm and hand, including the superficial palmar arch and the common palmar digital arteries branching off of it. Palmar aspect with the proximal part (elbow) at the top and the distal part (hand) at the bottom.

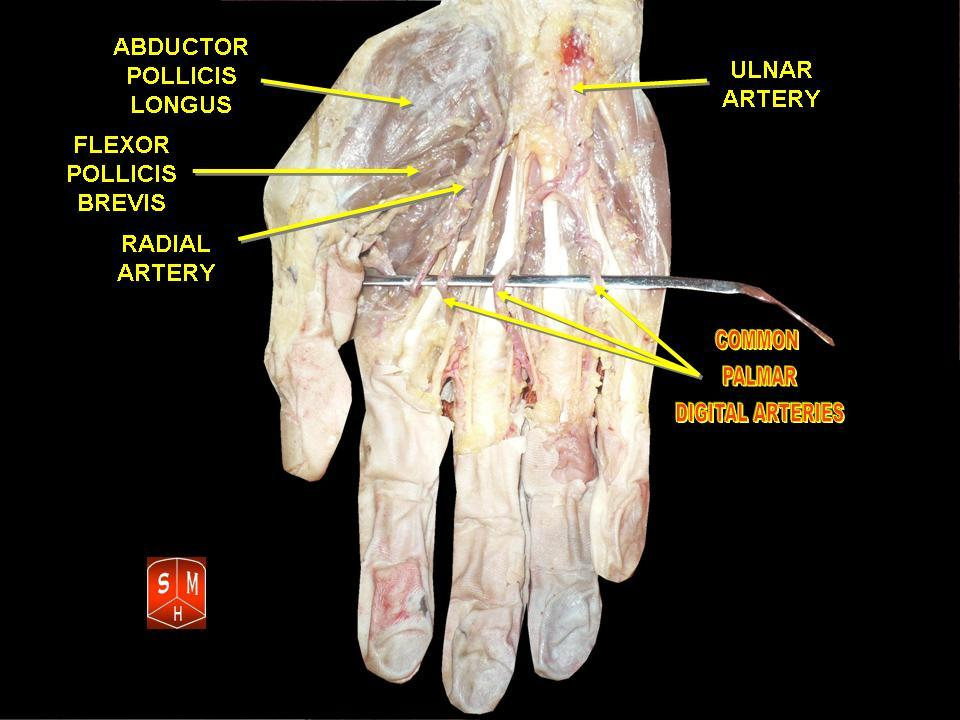
Dissection of right hands palmar side with instrument inserted under the common palmar digital arteries
