= Pronator teres syndrome =

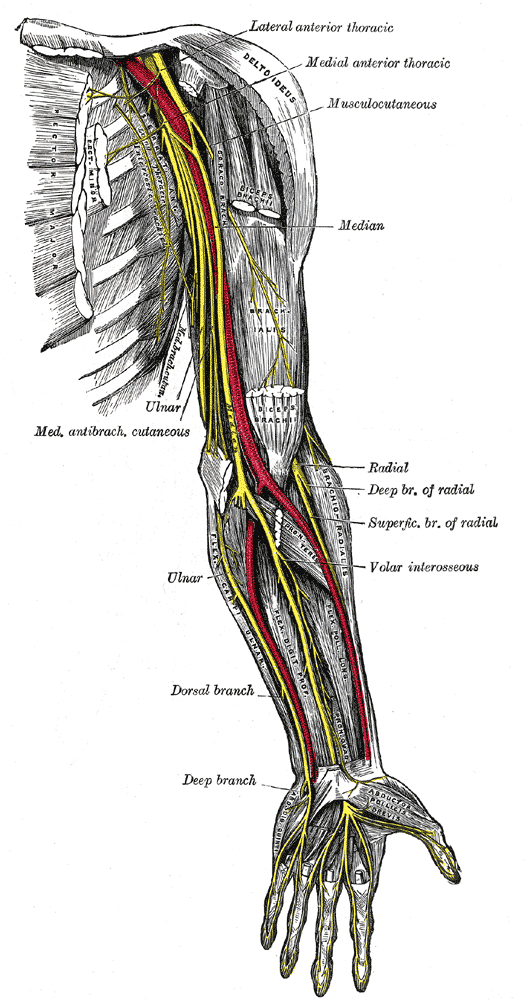
- Median nerve displayed
- Specialty: Neurology

Pronator teres syndrome is a compression neuropathy of the median nerve at the elbow. It is rare compared to compression at the wrist (carpal tunnel syndrome) or isolated injury of the anterior interosseous branch of the median nerve (anterior interosseous syndrome).

== Symptoms ==
Compression of the median nerve in the region of the elbow or proximal part of the forearm can cause pain and/or numbness in the distribution of the distal median nerve, and weakness of the muscles innervated by the anterior interosseous nerve: the flexor pollicis longus ("FPL"), the flexor digitorum profundus of the index finger ("FDP IF"), and the pronator quadratus ("PQ"). The pain tends to be at the wrist joint, in the distribution of the terminal branch of the anterior interosseous nerve, and is exacerbated by sustained pronation (i.e., wrist down). The weakness of the FPL and FDP IF is painless, but causes people to "drop things" and have a sense of loss of dexterity. Pinching with the wrist flexed magnifies the expression of this weakness, by reducing resting tension on the muscles of pinch. For instance, "child-proof" prescription pill bottles may be difficult to open. People easily adapt to this weakness without conscious effort or self-awareness, by using 1) the next muscles down, which are innervated by a different nerve, or 2) using ligaments to give resistance, pinching laterally against the index finger or against the side of the end of the thumb, or 3) by what is called "tenodesis", which in this case is extension of the wrist joint, which tightens the muscles on the palm side of the hand. These adaptations on a moment-to-moment basis do not cause problems, but over time in loose-jointed patients, such as many women and people with collagen disorders such as Ehlers–Danlos syndrome, the adaptations can cause soft tissue failures that can become painful, particularly at the base of the thumb and in the proximal forearm (i.e., "Tennis Elbow" in a non-tennis player).

== Causes ==
The most common cause is entrapment of the median nerve between the two heads of the pronator teres muscle. Other causes are compression of the nerve from the fibrous arch of the flexor superficialis, or the thickening of the bicipital aponeurosis.

== Anatomy ==
The median nerve passes through the cubital fossa and passes between the two heads of pronator teres muscle into the forearm. It then runs between flexor digitorum superficialis and flexor digitorum profundus muscles and enters the hand through the carpal tunnel.

It innervates most of the flexor muscles in the forearm and hand. Its sensory component supplies the skin of the palm, thumb, index and middle finger as well as half the ring finger, and, importantly and often forgotten, the bones of the wrist.

In the proximal forearm it gives rise to the anterior interosseous nerve which innervates the flexor of the thumb (FPL), the flexor digitorum profundus of the index finger (FDP IF), and the pronator quadratus, and terminates in a sensory branch to the bones of the wrist, i.e., the carpal tunnel. Compression of the proximal median nerve results in weakness of these three muscles, and can cause aching pain in the wrist on the basis of the sensory nerve to the carpal bones.

== Diagnosis ==
The most common chief complaint is intermittent pain in the wrist, associated with sustained pronation, frequently misinterpreted by patients and providers as "tendonitis". This is usually accompanied by the perception of "hand weakness", and "dropping things". The characteristic physical finding is tenderness over the proximal median nerve, with ensuing numbness in the hand in less than a minute, and/or numbness in the hand with resisted pronation of the forearm in less than a minute.

The flexor pollicis longus and FDP of the index finger are weak, leading to impairment of pinching firmly. This reflects involvement of the anterior interosseous nerve.

Sensory changes may be found in the first three fingers as well as in the palm, indicating impairment of the median nerve proximal to the flexor retinaculum, but tend to involve the sensation of the entire hand going numb at night, with any pressure on the median nerve on the areas at the inside of the elbow.

The clinical and electrophysiological features of pronator teres syndrome are quite different from patients with carpal tunnel syndrome or pure anterior interosseous syndrome, and are typically normal. Proper localisation is crucial to treatment options.

Conduction velocity of the median nerve in the proximal forearm may be slow but the distal latency and sensory nerve action potential at the wrist are normal.

Although MRI may show denervation atrophy of the affected muscles, its role in the evaluation of pronator teres syndrome is unclear.

If the EMG or the MRI are abnormal for the pronator teres muscle and the flexor carpi radialis, this implies that the problem is at or proximal to the elbow, as the takeoff of the nerves to these muscles occurs proximal to the elbow.

== Treatment ==
Injection of corticosteroids into the pronator teres muscle may produce relief of symptoms.

Massage therapy can also provide relief for individuals experiencing this condition.

Surgical nerve decompression can provide benefit in selected cases.

== See also ==
- Struthers' ligament
- Nerve compression syndrome
