= Anterior interosseous =

Anterior interosseous may refer to:

- Anterior interosseous artery
- Anterior interosseous ligament
- Anterior interosseous nerve
- Anterior interosseous syndrome
