= Interosseous nerve =

interosseous nerve may refer to:

- Anterior interosseous nerve, a branch of the median nerve that supplies the deep muscles on the anterior of the forearm
- Anterior interosseous syndrome or Kiloh-Nevin syndrome I is a medical condition in which damage to the anterior interosseous nerve
- Deep branch of radial nerve, also known by the Latin term nervus interosseus dorsalis
- Posterior interosseous nerve, or dorsal interosseous nerve, is a nerve in the forearm
