= Palmar branch =

Palmar branch may refer to:

- Palmar branch of the median nerve
- Palmar branch of ulnar nerve
