= Pronator teres muscle =

Superficial muscle in the anterior side of the forearm

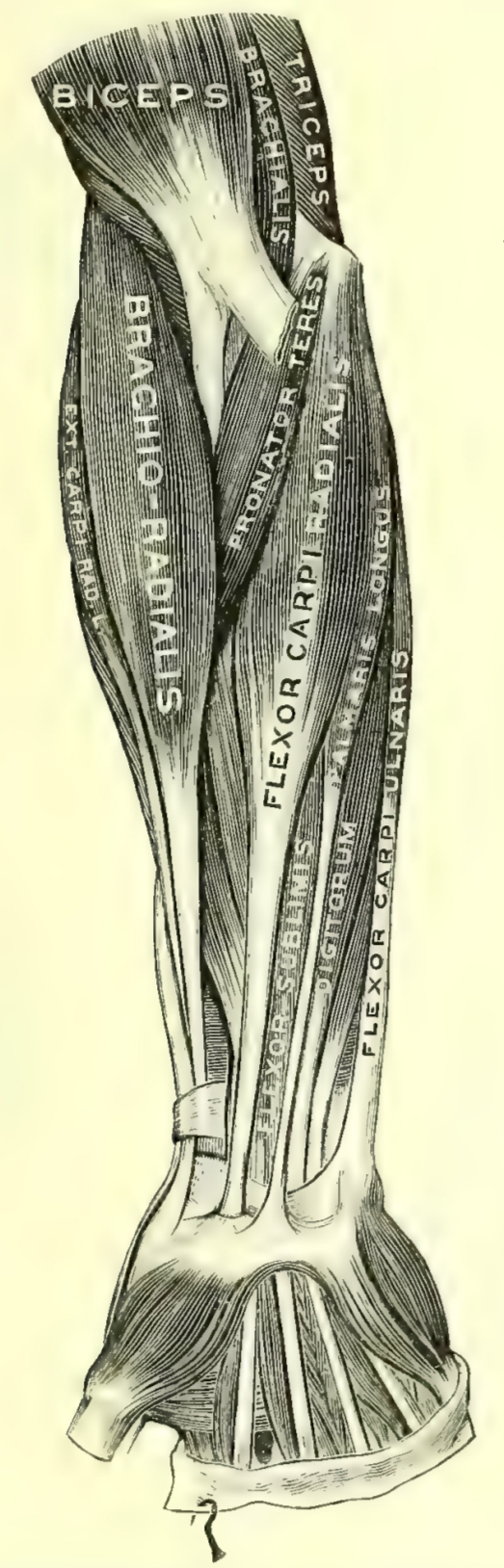
- Anterior view of the right forearm. Superficial muscles. Pronator teres labeled at center. (After Testut's Anatomy.)

Details
- Origin: Humeral head: medial supracondylar ridge of humerus slightly above the medial epicondyle of humerus (common flexor tendon); Ulnar head: coronoid process of ulna
- Insertion: Middle of the lateral surface of the body of the radius
- Artery: Ulnar artery and radial artery
- Nerve: Median nerve
- Actions: Pronation of forearm, flexes elbow
- Antagonist: Supinator muscle

Identifiers
- Latin: musculus pronator teres
- TA98: A04.6.02.025
- TA2: 2478
- FMA: 38450

The pronator teres is a muscle (located mainly in the forearm) that, along with the pronator quadratus, serves to pronate the forearm (turning it so that the palm faces posteriorly when from the anatomical position).

== Structure ==
The pronator teres has two heads—humeral and ulnar.

- The humeral head, the larger and more superficial, arises from the medial supracondylar ridge immediately superior to the medial epicondyle of the humerus, and from the common flexor tendon (which arises from the medial epicondyle).
- The ulnar head (or ulnar tuberosity) is a thin fasciculus, which arises from the medial side of the coronoid process of the ulna, and joins the preceding at an acute angle.

The median nerve enters the forearm between the two heads of the muscle, and is separated from the ulnar artery by the ulnar head.

The muscle passes obliquely across the forearm, and ends in a flat tendon, which is inserted into a rough impression at the middle of the lateral surface of the body of the radius, just distal to the insertion of the supinator.

The lateral border of the muscle forms the medial boundary of the triangular hollow known as the cubital fossa, which is situated anterior to the elbow.

=== Nerve supply ===
The pronator teres is innervated by the median nerve and nerve roots C6 and C7.

To stimulate the pronator teres, a signal begins in the precentral gyrus in the brain and goes down through the internal capsule. It continues down the corticospinal tracts through the capsule, midbrain, and pons where it arrives at the medullar pyramids. Once at the pyramids, the corticospinal tracts decussate and the signal goes down the lateral corticospinal tract until it reaches the ventral horns of C5, C6, C7, C8, and T1. The signal then goes through the ventral rami and down the root ganglions of C5, C6, C7, C8, and T1 (which together form the brachial plexus). Next, the signal goes down the median nerve branch of the brachial plexus and stimulates the pronator teres to contract causing the hand to pronate.

=== Variation ===
Occasionally, the ulnar head is absent. Also, additional slips from the medial intermuscular septum, from the biceps brachii, and from the brachialis occasionally occur.

== Function ==
Pronator teres pronates the forearm, turning the hand posteriorly. If the elbow is flexed to a right angle, then pronator teres will turn the hand so that the palm faces inferiorly. It is assisted in this action by pronator quadratus.

It also weakly flexes the elbow, or assists in flexion at the elbow when there is strong resistance.

== Clinical significance ==
Pronator teres syndrome is one cause of wrist pain. It is a type of neurogenic pain.

- Patients with the pronator teres syndrome have numbness in median nerve distribution with repetitive pronation/supination of the forearm, not flexion and extension of the elbow
- Early fatigue of the forearm muscles is seen with repetitive stressful motion, especially pronation
- EMG may show only mildly reduced conduction velocities
- Despite their anatomic proximity, patients with pronator teres syndrome do not have a higher incidence of AIN syndrome
- Other sites of compression:
  - Ligament of Struthers
  - Lacertus fibrosus
  - Proximal arch of the FDS
  - Rare causes such as following tendon transfers for radial palsy
- Dissimilarity to CTS:
  - Positive Tinel's sign in forearm rather than at wrist
  - Negative Phalen's maneuver
  - Dysesthesia of palmar triangle
  - Pain on resistance to pronation
  - Pain in forearm on resistance to isolated flexion of the PIP joint of long and ring fingers

In C5 tetraplegia or radial nerve palsy patients, pronator teres tendon can be rerouted, so called tendon transfer, to extensor carpi radialis brevis tendon to restore wrist extension.

== Etymology ==
The word pronator comes from the Latin pronus, which means “inclined forward or lying face downward”, and has to do with the muscle's action being pronation of the forearm. The Latin term teres, which means "round or cylindrical shaped" or "long and round", refers to the shape of the muscle. The indirect English translation of pronator teres is therefore: cylindrical muscle that turns the forearm (and the palm along with it) down.

== Additional images ==
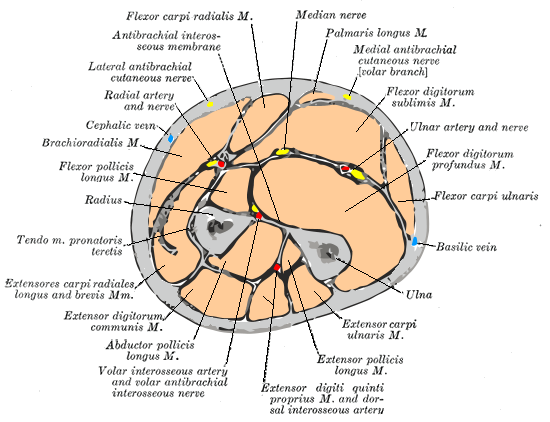
Cross-section through the middle of the forearm.

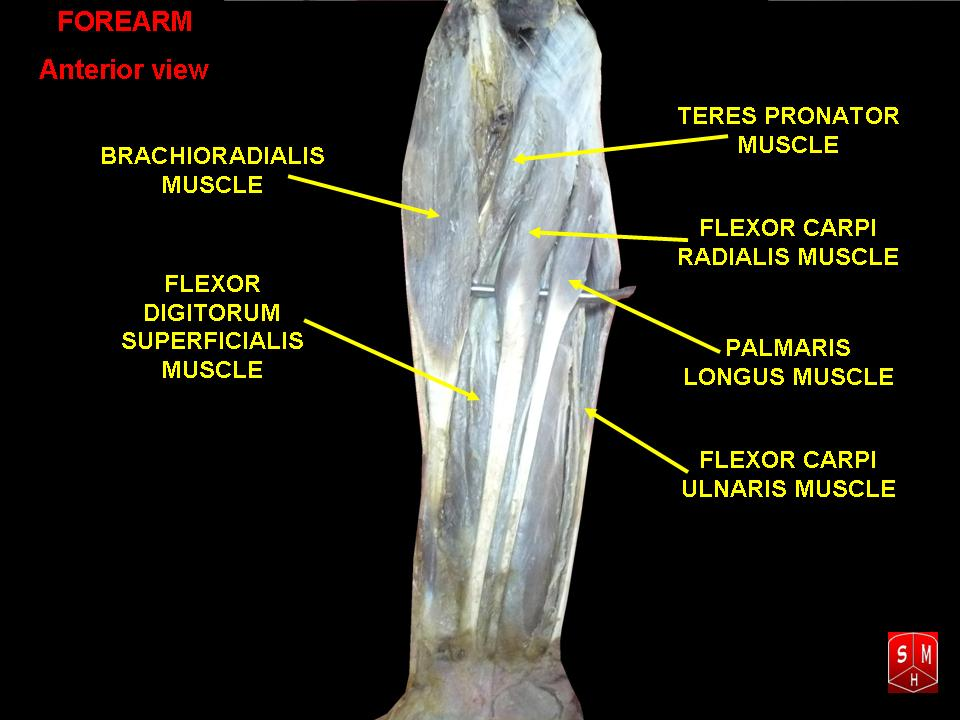
Cadaveric pronator teres of the right upper limb. Anterior view.

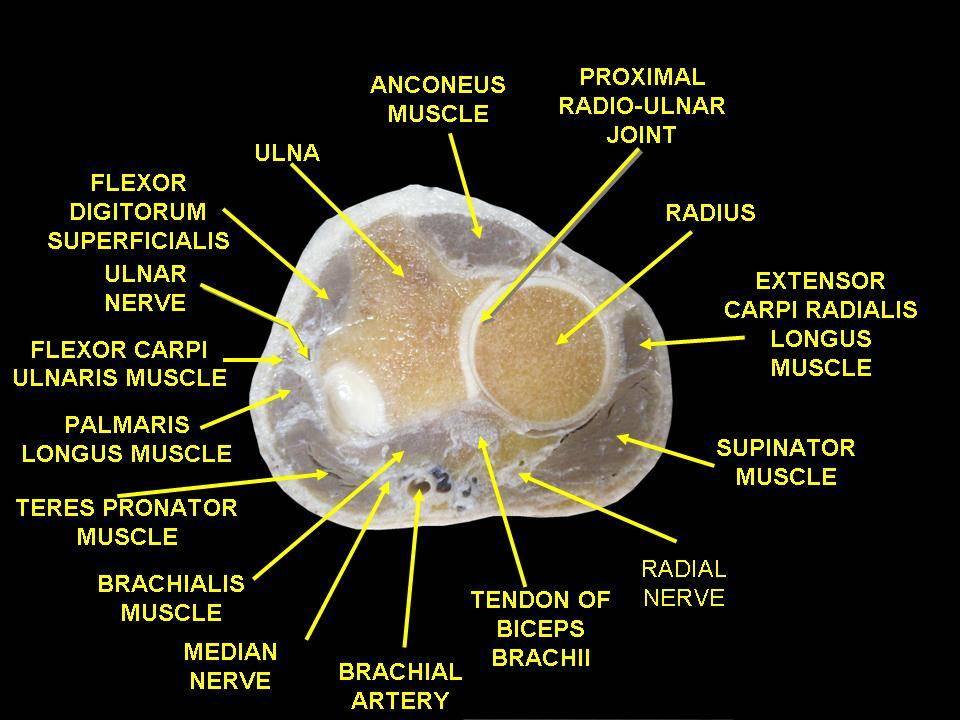
Muscles of upper limb. Cross section.

Simplified diagram demonstrating the attachment of the pronator teres

== See also ==
- Krukenberg procedure
