= Anterior interosseous nerve =

Branch of the upper limb nerve

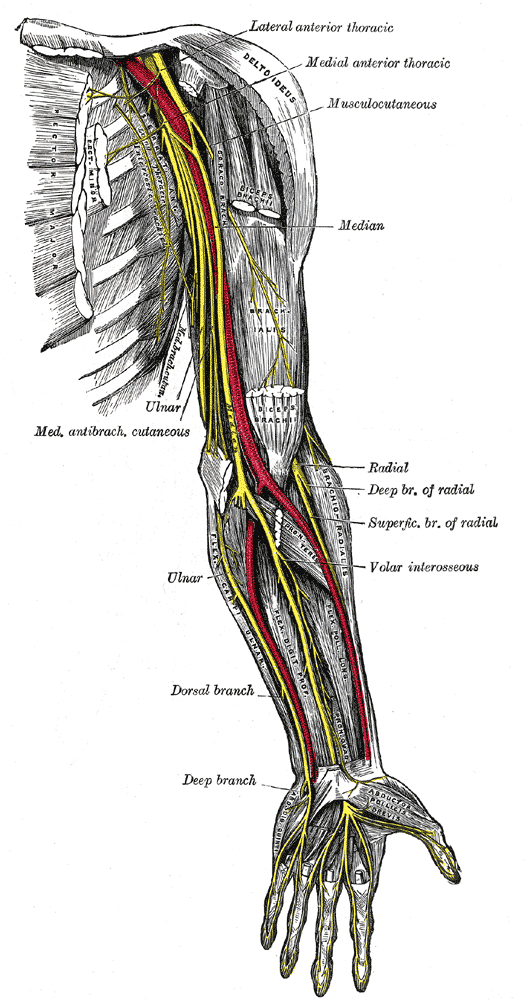
- Nerves of the left upper extremity. (Volar interosseus labeled at center right.)

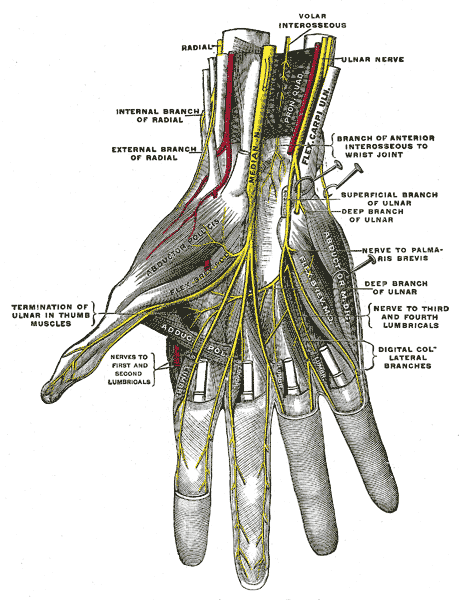
- Deep palmar nerves. (Volar interosseous labeled at center top.)

Details
- From: Median nerve

Identifiers
- Latin: nervus interosseus antebrachii anterior
- TA98: A14.2.03.034
- TA2: 6460
- FMA: 44822

The anterior interosseous nerve (volar interosseous nerve) is a branch of the median nerve that supplies the deep muscles on the anterior of the forearm, except the ulnar (medial) half of the flexor digitorum profundus. Its nerve roots come from C8 and T1.

It accompanies the anterior interosseous artery along the anterior of the interosseous membrane of the forearm, in the interval between the flexor pollicis longus and flexor digitorum profundus, supplying the whole of the former and (most commonly) the radial half of the latter, and ending below in the pronator quadratus and wrist joint.

Note that the median nerve supplies all flexor muscles of the forearm except for the ulnar half of flexor digitorum profundus and the flexor carpi ulnaris, which is a superficial muscle of the forearm.

== Innervation ==
The anterior interosseous nerve classically innervates 2.5 muscles:

which are deep muscles of the forearm

- flexor pollicis longus
- pronator quadratus
- the radial (lateral) half of flexor digitorum profundus (inserting on the second and third digits)

and the inferior radioulnar, wrist and carpal joints.

== Injury ==
A branch of the median nerve, the anterior interosseous nerve (AIN) can be affected by either direct penetrating injury, possibly compression in a fashion similar to carpal tunnel syndrome, but most commonly an idiopathic inflammatory process (referred to an Anterior Interosseous Syndrome). As might be expected, the symptoms involve weakness in the muscle innervated by the AIN including the flexor digitorum profundus muscle to the index (and sometimes the middle) finger, the flexor pollicis longus muscle to the thumb and the pronator quadratus of the distal forearm. AIN also has large sensory nerve to the volar wrist bones and compression of the AIN branch of the median nerve at the elbow can cause referred pain in the volar wrist/distal volar forearm. Non-surgical treatment consists of splinting, proximal tissue massage and anti-inflammatory drugs. Surgical treatment consists of releasing the compression on the nerve from surrounding structures. Pronator Syndrome is similar, but involves both the AIN as well as the median nerve proper.

== Clinical significance ==
Following peripheral nerve injury to the ulnar nerve, the AIN is often used as a donor branch to reinnervate the paralysed muscles innervated by the ulnar nerve.

== See also ==
- Carpal Tunnel Syndrome
- Posterior interosseous nerve

== Additional images ==
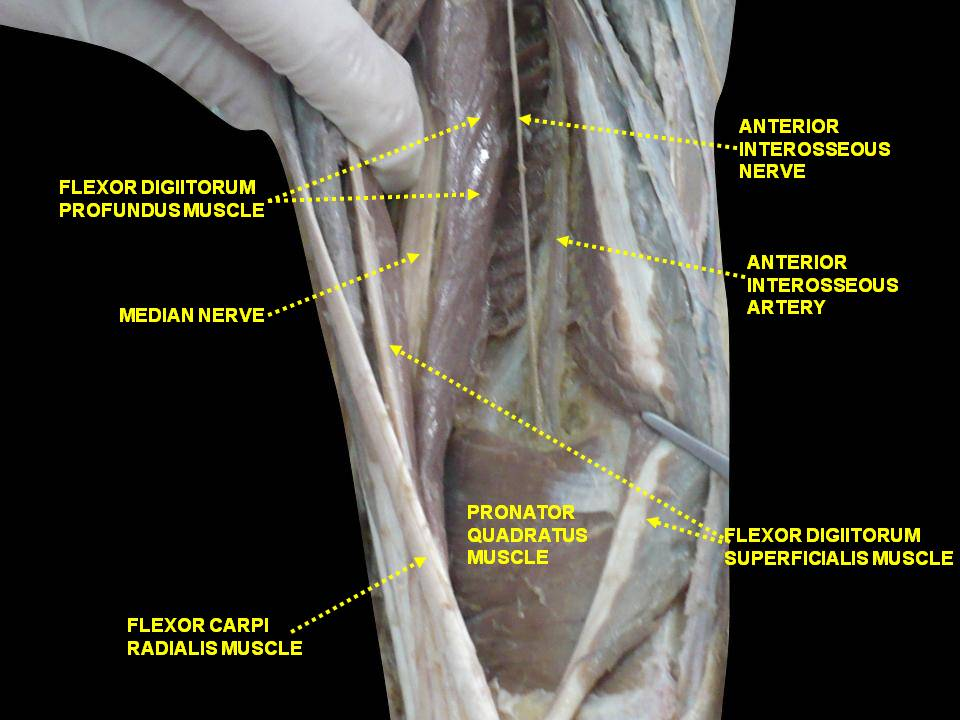
Anterior interosseous nerve.Deep dissection.Anterior.
