= Median artery =

Anatomical variant artery

- Median artery in green

Details
- Location: Forearm, when present
- Function: Anatomical variant artery found in 35% of humans and some other animals.

Identifiers
- TA98: A12.2.09.049
- TA2: 4663
- FMA: 77142

The median artery is an artery that is occasionally found in humans and other animals.

The prevalence was around 10% in people born in the mid-1880s compared to 30% in those born in the late 20th century, and 35% of people born as of 2020; a significant increase in a fairly short period of time, when it comes to evolution. When the median artery prevalence reaches 50% or more, it should not be considered as a variant, but as a ‘normal’ human structure. "This increase could have resulted from mutations of genes involved in median artery development or health problems in mothers during pregnancy, or both. If this trend continues, a majority of people will have median artery of the forearm by 2100."

When present, it is found in the forearm, between the radial artery and ulnar artery. It runs with the median nerve and supplies the same structures as that nerve. It may be unilateral or bilateral.

It passes deep to the flexor retinaculum and may terminate at one or more of the palmar arches.

In a deep wrist laceration, such as from a suicide attempt, the median artery may be incised, risking exsanguination.

An individual who does not have a median artery appears to suffer no ill effects.
