= Flexor digitorum superficialis muscle =

Forearm muscle that flexes the fingers

Flexor digitorum superficialis
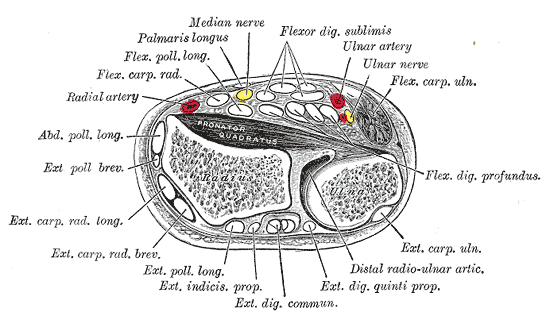
- Transverse section across distal ends of radius and ulna. (Flexor dig. subliminis labeled at center top.)

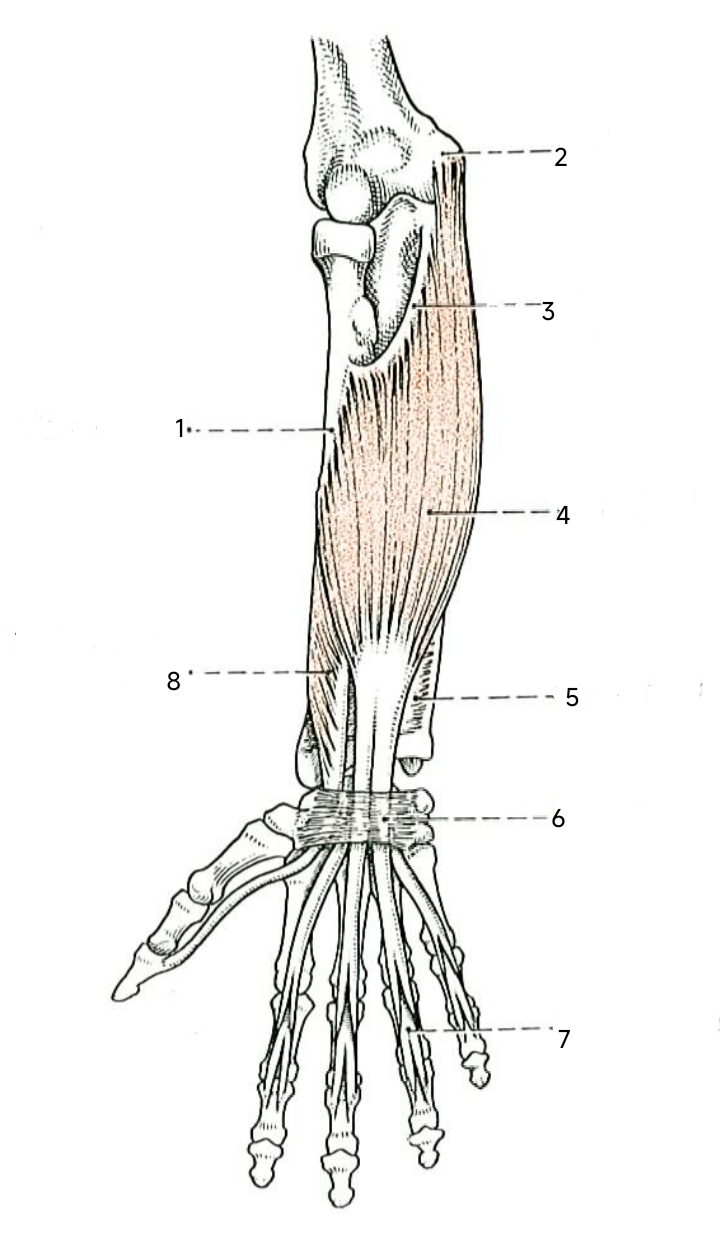
- Flexor digitorum superficialis and adjacent muscles; right side, anterior view. 1. Oblique line of radius — 2. Medial epicondyle — 3. Sublime bridge (tendinous arch of FDS) — 4. Flexor digitorum superficialis (FDS) — 5. Pronator quadratus — 6. Flexor retinaculum — 7. Camper's chiasm — 8. Flexor pollicis longus. (After Charpy.)

Details
- Origin: Medial epicondyle of the humerus (common flexor tendon) as well as parts of the radius and ulna
- Insertion: Anterior margins on the base of the middle phalanges of the four fingers
- Artery: Radial artery
- Nerve: Median nerve
- Actions: Flexor of fingers (primarily at proximal interphalangeal joints)
- Antagonist: Extensor digitorum muscle

Identifiers
- Latin: musculus flexor digitorum superficialis
- TA98: A04.6.02.033
- TA2: 2486
- FMA: 38469

Flexor digitorum superficialis (flexor digitorum sublimis) or flexor digitorum communis sublimis is an extrinsic flexor muscle of the fingers at the proximal interphalangeal joints.

It is in the anterior compartment of the forearm. It is sometimes considered to be the deepest part of the superficial layer of this compartment, and sometimes considered to be a distinct, "intermediate layer" of this compartment. It is relatively common for the flexor digitorum superficialis to be missing from the little finger, bilaterally and unilaterally, which can cause problems when diagnosing a little finger injury.

== Structure ==
The muscle has two classically described heads – the humeroulnar and radial – and it is between these heads that the median nerve and ulnar artery pass. The ulnar collateral ligament of elbow joint gives its origin to part of this muscle.

Four long tendons come off this muscle near the wrist and travel through the carpal tunnel formed by the flexor retinaculum. These tendons, along with those of flexor digitorum profundus, are enclosed by a common flexor sheath. The tendons attach to the anterior margins on the bases of the intermediate phalanges of the four fingers. These tendons have a split (Camper's chiasm) at the end of them through which the tendons of flexor digitorum profundus pass.

=== Innervation ===
The flexor digitorum superficialis muscle is innervated by the median nerve (C7, C8, T1).

== Function ==
The primary function of flexor digitorum superficialis is flexion of the middle phalanges of the four fingers (excluding the thumb) at the proximal interphalangeal joints, however under continued action it also flexes the metacarpophalangeal joints and wrist joint.

To test flexor digitorum superficialis, one finger is flexed at the proximal interphalangeal joint against resistance, while the remaining three fingers are held fully extended (to inactivate flexor digitorum profundus).

== Additional images ==
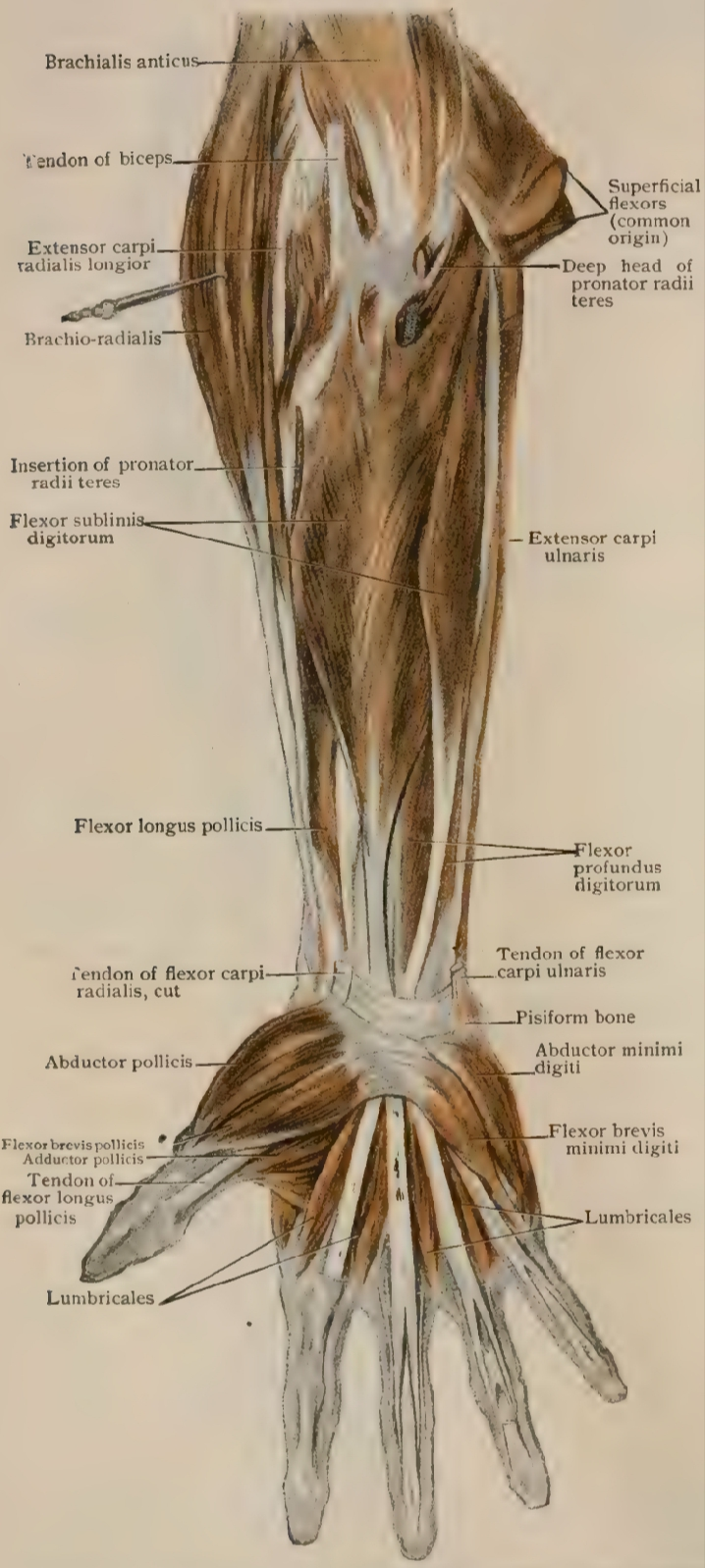
Dissection of muscles of forearm and hand, anterior aspect; most superficial muscles have been removed (right upper limb).

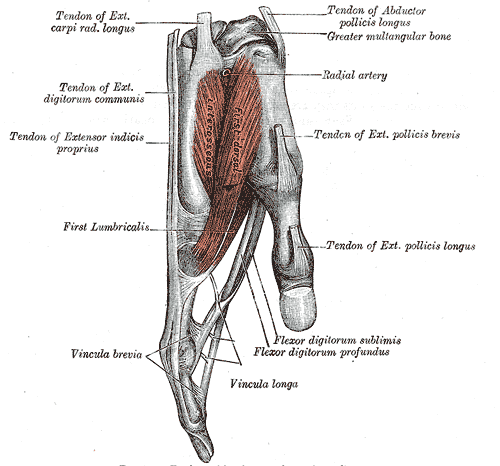
Tendons of forefinger and vincula tendina.

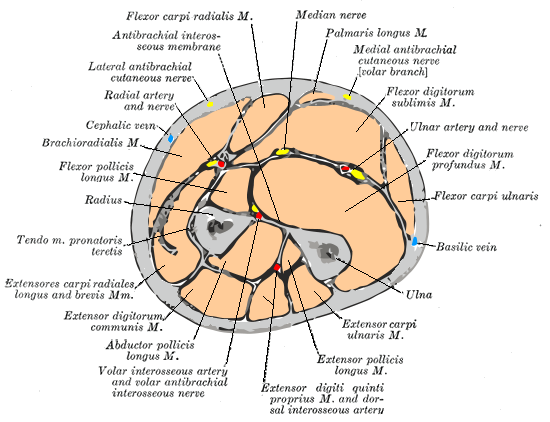
Cross-section through the middle of the forearm.

Transverse section across the wrist and digits.

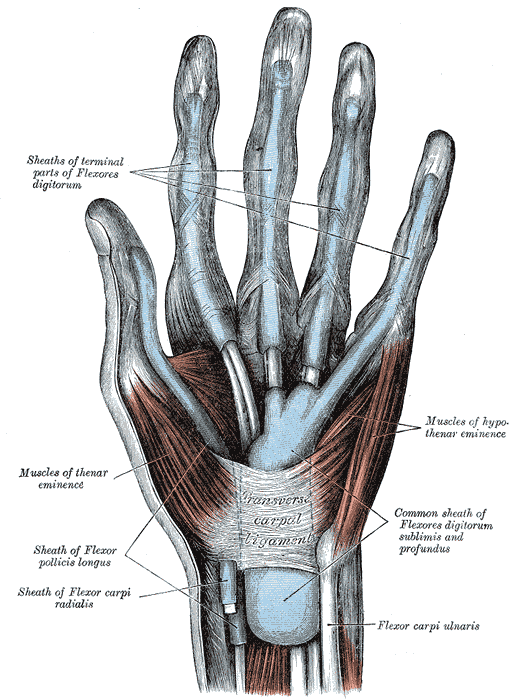
The mucous sheaths of the tendons on the front of the wrist and digits.

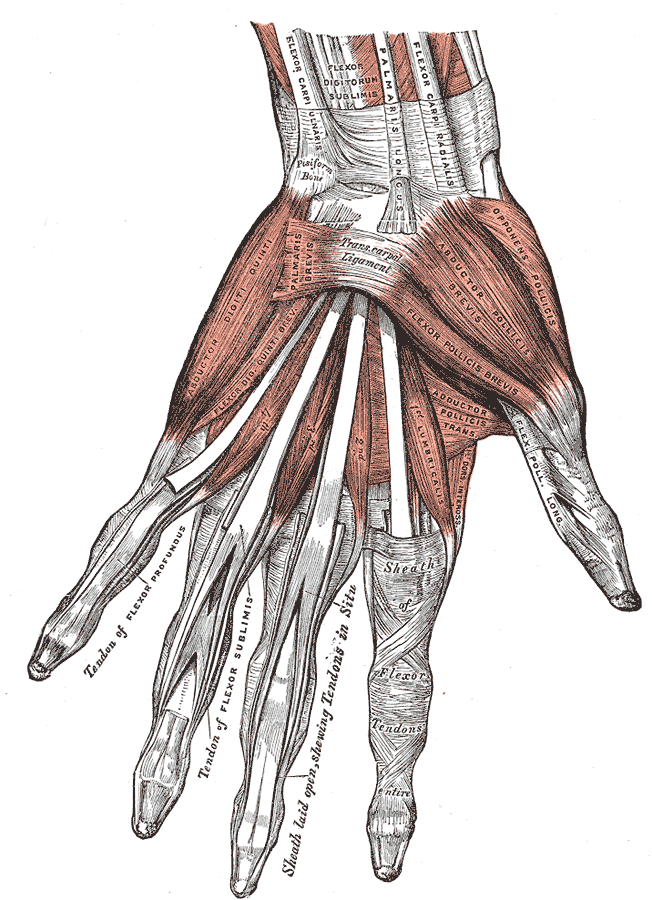
The muscles of the left hand. Palmar surface.

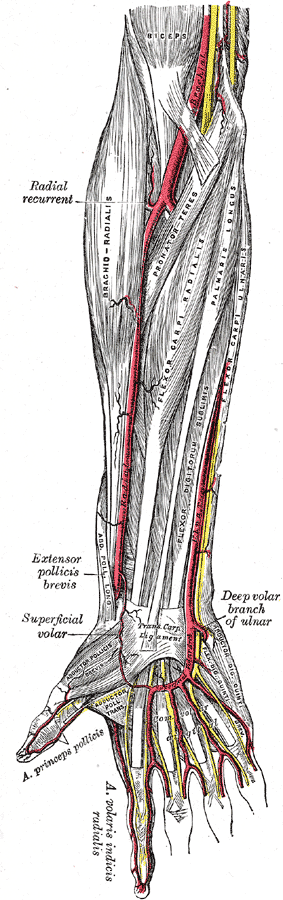
The radial and ulnar arteries.

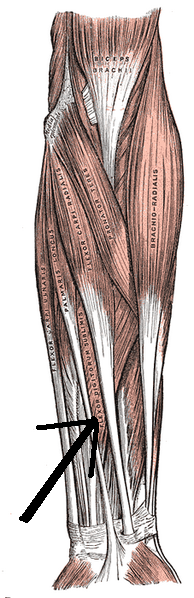

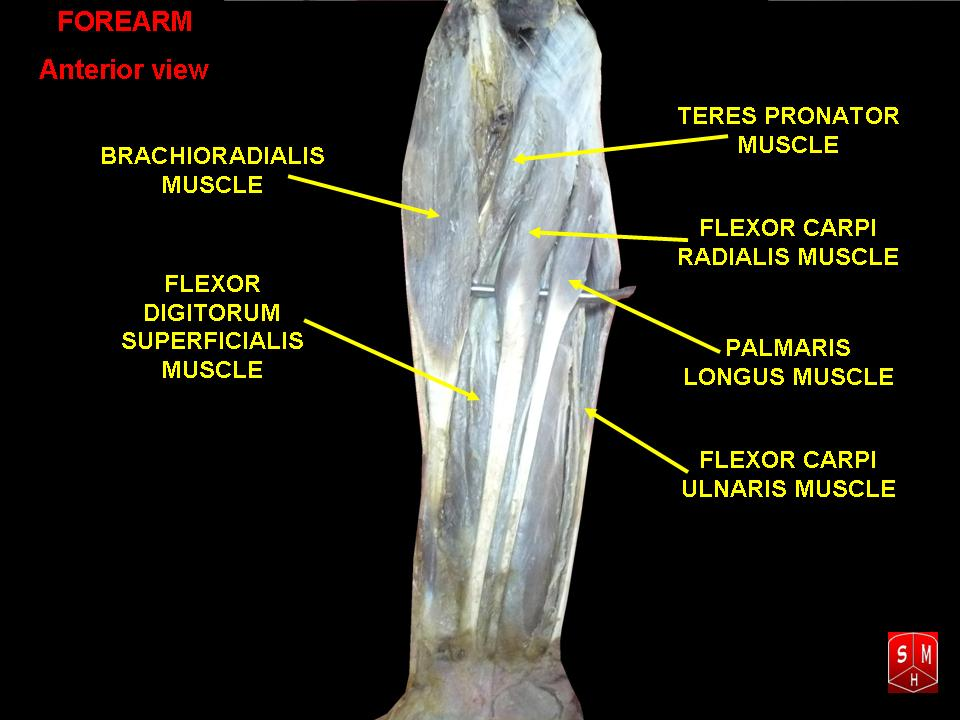
Flexor digitorum superficialis muscle

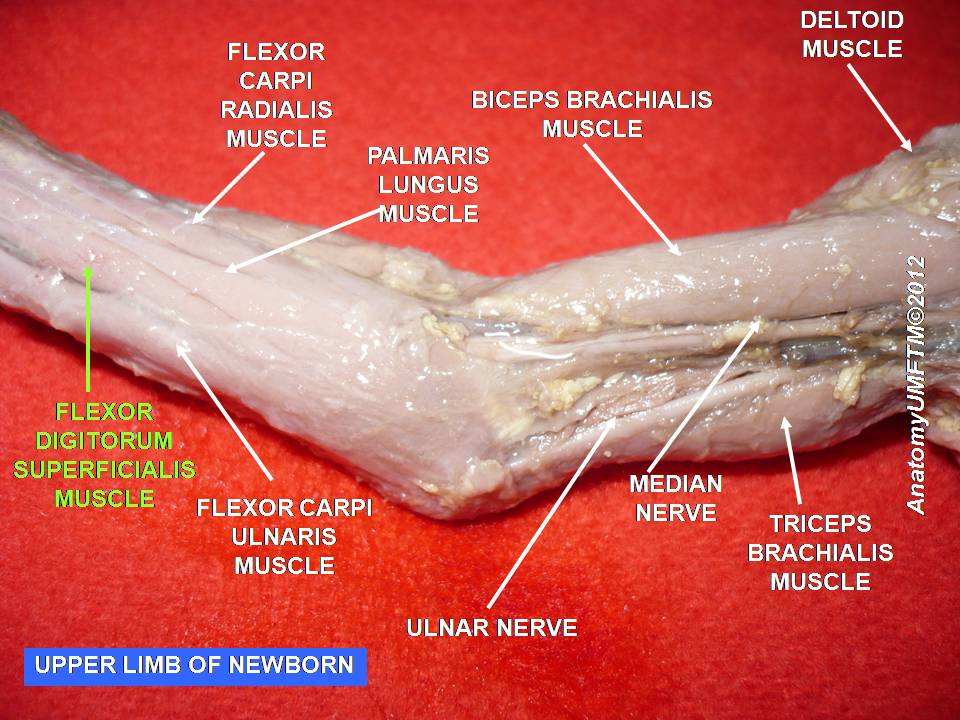
Flexor digitorum superficialis muscle

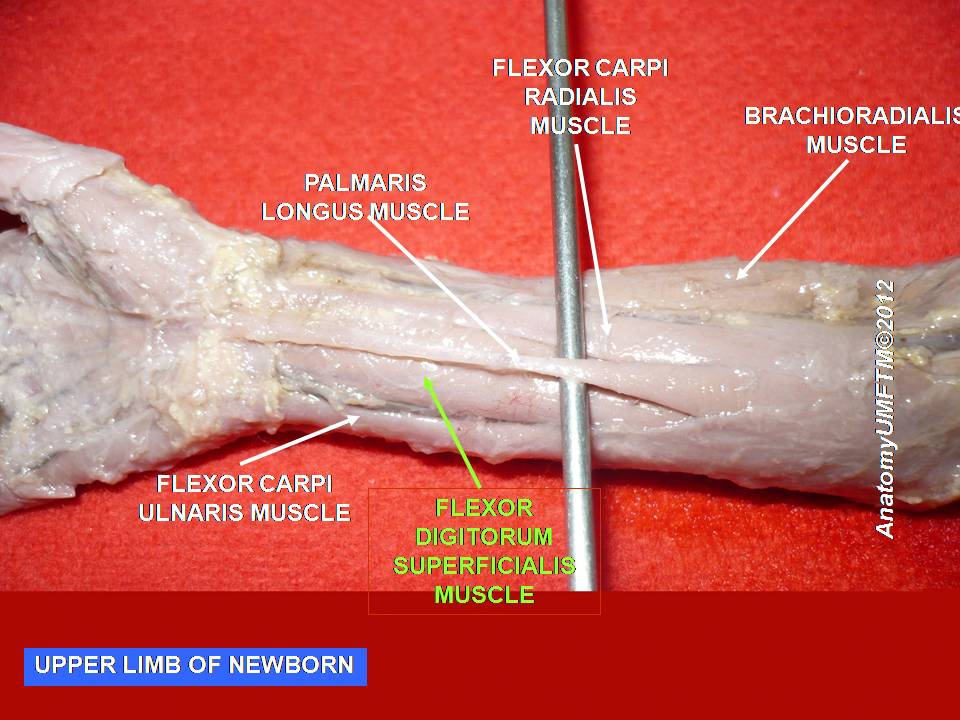
Flexor digitorum superficialis muscle

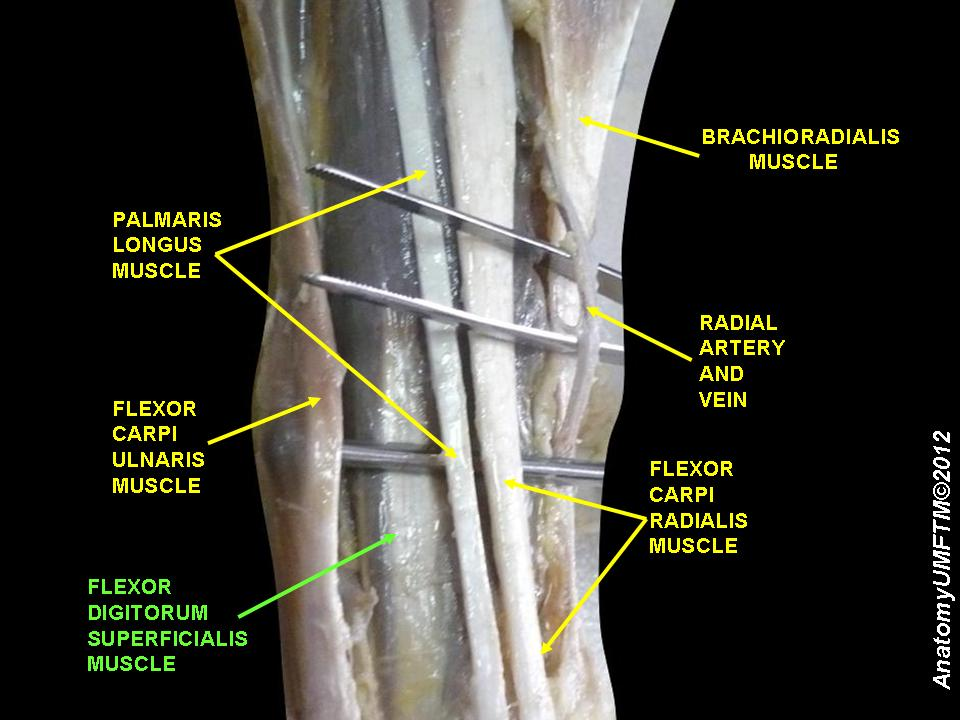
Flexor digitorum superficialis muscle

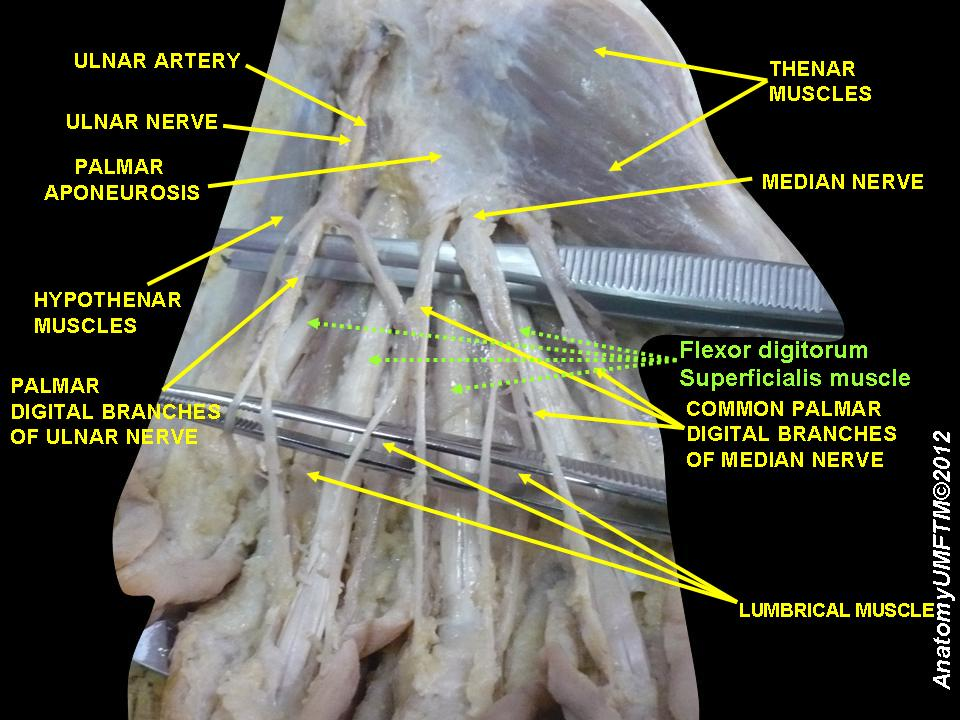
Flexor digitorum superficialis muscle

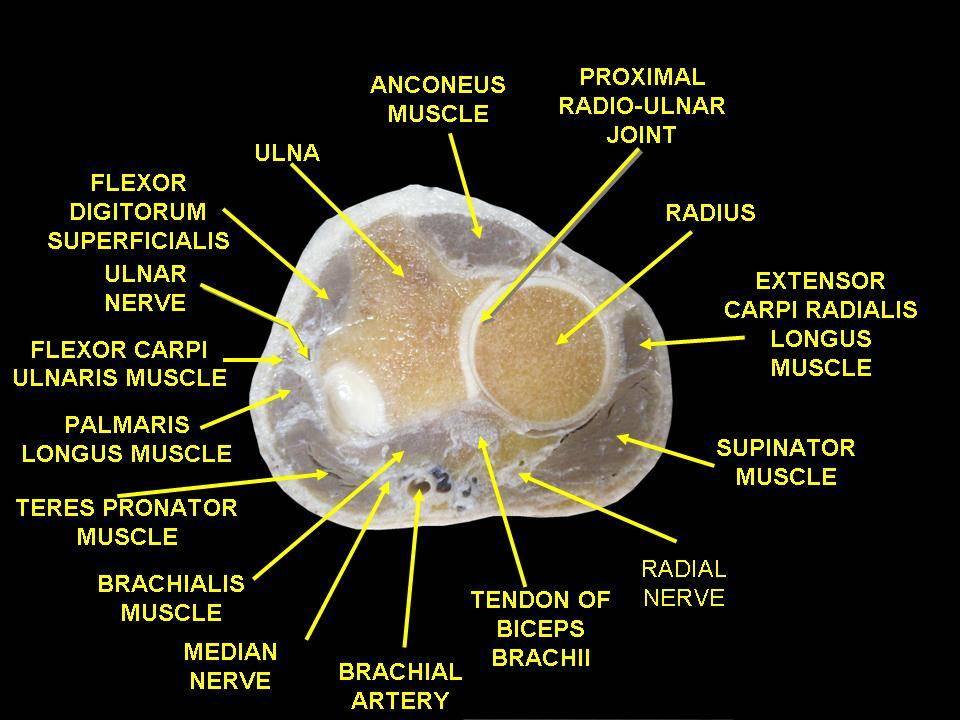
Muscles of upper limb. Cross section.

== See also ==
- Flexor digitorum profundus muscle
