= Palmar branch of the median nerve =

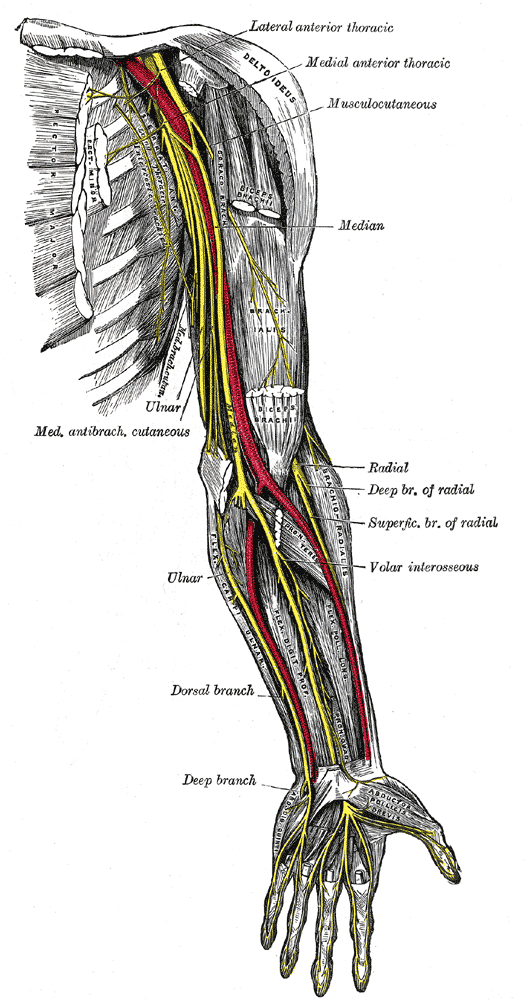
- Nerves of the left upper extremity.

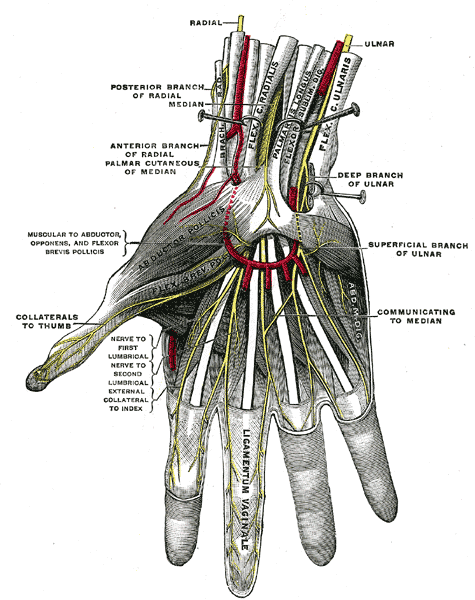
- Superficial palmar nerves.

Details
- From: Median nerve

Identifiers
- Latin: ramus palmaris nervi mediani
- TA98: A14.2.03.036
- TA2: 6462
- FMA: 44836

The palmar branch of the median nerve is a branch of the median nerve which arises at the distal part of the forearm.

== Branches ==
It pierces the palmar carpal ligament, and divides into a lateral and a medial branch;

- The lateral branch supplies the skin over the ball of the thumb, and communicates with the volar branch of the lateral antebrachial cutaneous nerve.
- The medial branch supplies the skin of the palm and communicates with the palmar cutaneous branch of the ulnar.

== Clinical significance ==
Unlike most of the median nerve innervation of the hand, the palmar branch travels superficial to the Flexor retinaculum of the hand. Therefore, this portion of the median nerve usually remains functioning during carpal tunnel syndrome.

== Additional images ==
Diagram of segmental distribution of the cutaneous nerves of the right upper extremity.
