= Anterior interosseous syndrome =

- Other names: Kiloh-Nevin syndrome I
- Specialty: Neurology, hand surgery

Anterior interosseous syndrome is an idiopathic neuropathy of the anterior interosseous nerve (AIN), a distal motor and sensory branch of the median nerve. It is characterized by weakness of the pincer movement of the thumb and index finger, the flexor pollicis longus and the part of the flexor digitorum profundus innervated by the AIN specifically. There may be distal forearm and wrist pain (the terminal, sensory branch of the AIN innervates the bones of the carpal tunnel).

Most cases of AIN syndrome are now thought to be due to a transient neuritis. Other possibilities include compression of the AIN in the forearm. Trauma to the median nerve or around the proximal median nerve can cause AIN palsy.

Studies are limited, and no randomized controlled trials have been performed regarding the treatment of AIN syndrome. While the natural history of AIN syndrome is not fully understood, studies following patients who have been treated without surgery show that symptoms can resolve starting as late as one year after onset. Other retrospective studies have concluded that there is no difference in outcome in surgically versus nonsurgically treated patients. The role of surgery in AIN syndrome remains controversial. Indications for considering surgery include a known space-occupying lesion that is compressing the nerve (a mass) or fascial compression, and persistent symptoms beyond 1 year.

== Symptoms and signs ==
The findings are weakness in bending (flexion) the tips of the thumb and index finger.

=== Clinical signs ===
In a pure lesion of the anterior interosseous nerve there is weakness of the long flexor muscle of the thumb (Flexor pollicis longus) and the deep flexor muscle of the index finger (Flexor digitorum profundus). Weakness of the flexor digitorum profundus to the long finger varies because it is connected to the ulnar nerve innervated ring and small finger flexor digitorum profundus.

== Causes ==
Anterior interosseous nerve syndrome refers to idiopathic neuropathy. Palsies due to trauma such as pediatric supracondylar fractures or laceration from a penetrating injury are not considered anterior interosseous nerve syndrome.

The etiology of idiopathic anterior interosseous nerve syndrome is speculative. Some posit fibrous bands or arcuate (curved) ligaments may compress the anterior interosseous nerve.

The syndrome is often mistaken for index finger and/or thumb tendon laceration or rupture.

Although there is still controversy among upper extremity surgeons, AIN syndrome is now regarded as an idiopathic neuropathy, possibly a neuritis (inflammation of the nerve) in most cases; this is also referred to as Parsonage–Turner syndrome. Although the exact etiology is unknown, it is hypothesized that this is associated with an immune-mediated response that can follow surgery or other illnesses, such as pneumonia or severe viral illness.

== Anatomy ==
The anterior interosseous nerve is a branch of the median nerve that passes distally, anteriorly along the interosseous membrane and provides motor branches to the flexor pollicis longus, flexor digitorum profundus to index and middle finger as well as pronator quadratus, and supplies sensory feedback from the wrist bones.

== Diagnosis ==
Electrophysiologic testing can measure anterior interosseous neuropathy. Electromyography (EMG) measures abnormalities in the flexor pollicis longus, flexor digitorum profundus to the index and long fingers and the pronator quadratus muscles.

Anterior interosseous nerve syndrome is straightforward to diagnose on examination. Elecrodiagnostic measurements and imaging such as MRI and ultrasound imaging are not necessary for diagnosis or treatment and their role is unclear.

If asked to make the "OK" sign, patients will make a triangle sign instead. This 'pinch-test' exposes the weakness of the flexor pollicis longus muscle and the flexor digitorum profundus I leading to weakness of the flexion of the distal phalanges of the thumb and index finger. This results in impairment of the pincer movement and the patient will have difficulty picking up a small item, such as a coin, from a flat surface.

== Treatment ==
Most AIN neuropathy resolves over time without specific treatment, which is the preferred initial approach. The condition is not painful and there are no known disease-modifying treatments. Recovery often begins within the first several months and may continue up to one to two years after onset. In a prospective multicenter study of spontaneous AIN palsy, about 80% of nonoperatively treated limbs achieved good recovery, and all limbs showing any improvement within six months went on to recover well.

Surgery is generally reserved for neuropathy that does not improve after several months of conservative treatment, or where a specific compressive lesion is identified. Options include surgical exploration, neurolysis, and decompression, with good outcomes in selected patients. Interfascicular neurolysis has been advised for cases showing no recovery by six months after onset.

== History ==
The syndrome was first described by Parsonage and Turner in 1948 and further defined as isolated lesion of the anterior interosseous nerve by Leslie Gordon Kiloh and Samuel Nevin in 1952.

== See also ==
- Anterior interosseous nerve
- Nerve compression syndrome
- Neuritis
- Nerve decompression
