= Pronator quadratus muscle =

Muscle of the forearm

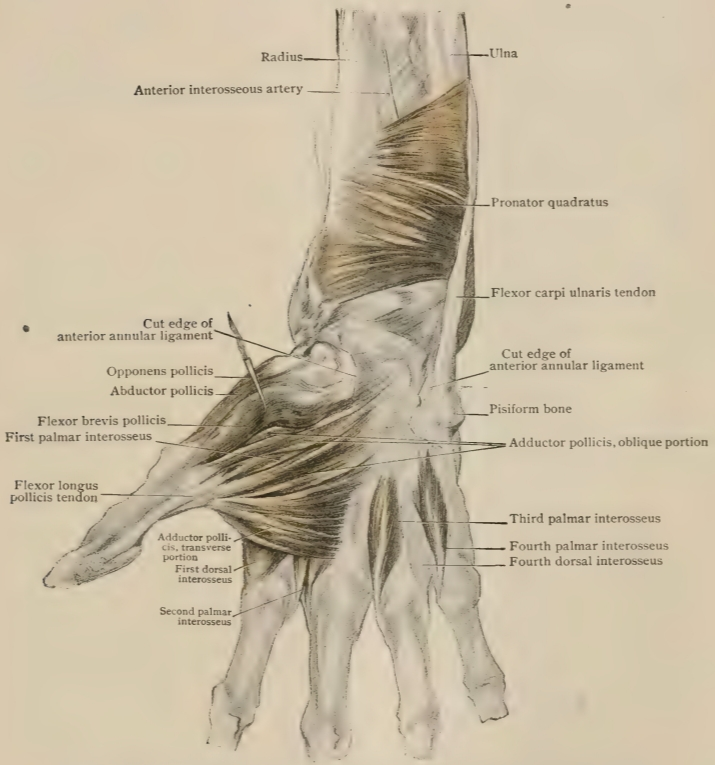
- Anterior view of a dissection of the right forearm and hand, showing the pronator quadratus and the short muscles of the thumb. (From Piersol's Anatomy.)

Details
- Origin: Medial, anterior surface of the ulna
- Insertion: Lateral, anterior surface of the radius
- Artery: Anterior interosseous artery
- Nerve: Median nerve (anterior interosseous nerve)
- Actions: Pronates the forearm
- Antagonist: Supinator muscle

Identifiers
- Latin: musculus pronator quadratus
- TA98: A04.6.02.038
- TA2: 2493
- FMA: 38453

Pronator quadratus is a square-shaped muscle on the distal forearm that acts to pronate (turn so the palm faces downwards) the hand.

== Structure ==
Its fibres run perpendicular to the direction of the arm, running from the most distal quarter of the anterior ulna to the distal quarter of the radius. It has two heads: the superficial head originates from the anterior distal aspect of the diaphysis (shaft) of the ulna and inserts into the anterior distal diaphysis of the radius, as well as its anterior metaphysis. The deep head has the same origin, but inserts proximal to the ulnar notch. It is the only muscle that attaches only to the ulna at one end and the radius at the other end. Arterial blood comes via the anterior interosseous artery.

=== Innervation ===
Pronator quadratus muscle is innervated by the anterior interosseous nerve, a branch of the median nerve.

== Function ==
When pronator quadratus contracts, it pulls the lateral side of the radius towards the ulna, thus pronating the hand. Its deep fibers serve to keep the two bones in the forearm bound together. Moreover, this muscle can be absent in some humans, however, that does not affect the action of pronation very notably, as the pronator teres does the major role in that action.

== Spinal tracts ==
The lateral corticospinal tract is responsible for the motor pathway of the pronator quadratus. This tract begins in the precentral gyrus of the motor cortex where a signal is transmitted from the upper motor nerve through the progression tracts of the internal capsule and through the cerebral peduncles of the midbrain. It decussates in the medulla and travels down the lateral corticospinal tract in the lateral column of the spinal cord. It then decussates in the spinal cord and synapses at the anterior horn to the lower motor neurons of the skeletal muscles. The cuneate fasciculus tract is responsible for the sensation of the pronator quadratus position and movement, deep touch, visceral pain, and vibration. This tract begins in the dorsal nerve root where the signal is transmitted through the dorsal horn and up the posterior column of the spinal cord. It synapses with an interneuron in the gracile nucleus. It then decussates in the medial lemniscus of the medulla, travels through the cuneate nucleus and through the medial lemniscus of the midbrain to synapse in the thalamus. It synapses with a third order neuron and transmits the signal to the postcentral gyrus of the somesthetic cortex. This could apply to any muscle in the upper limb and not specific to this muscle.

== Additional images ==
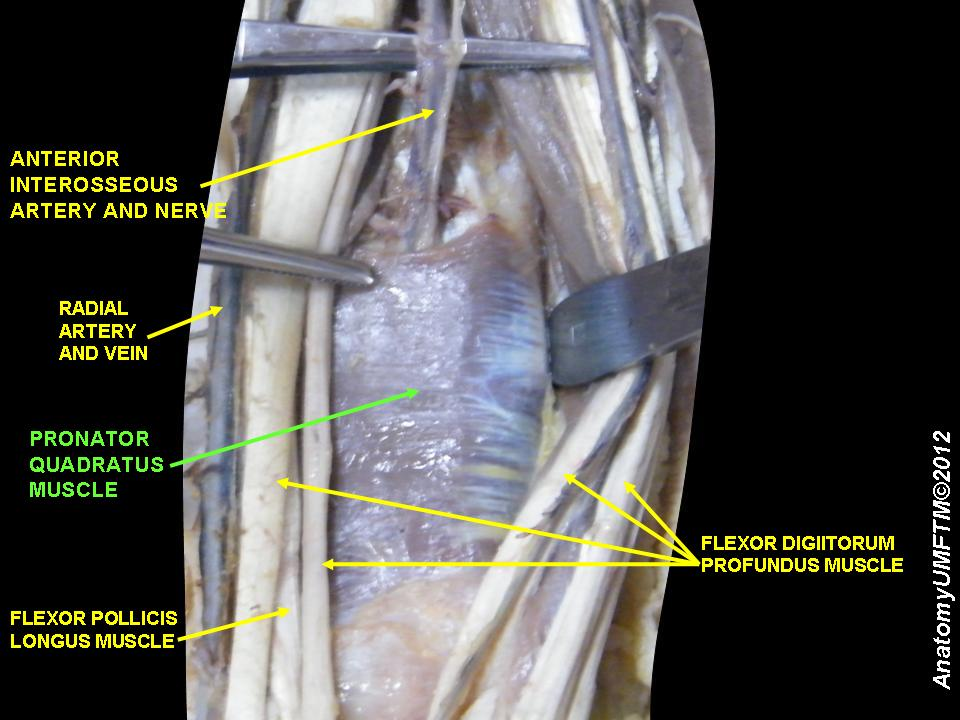
Pronator quadratus muscle

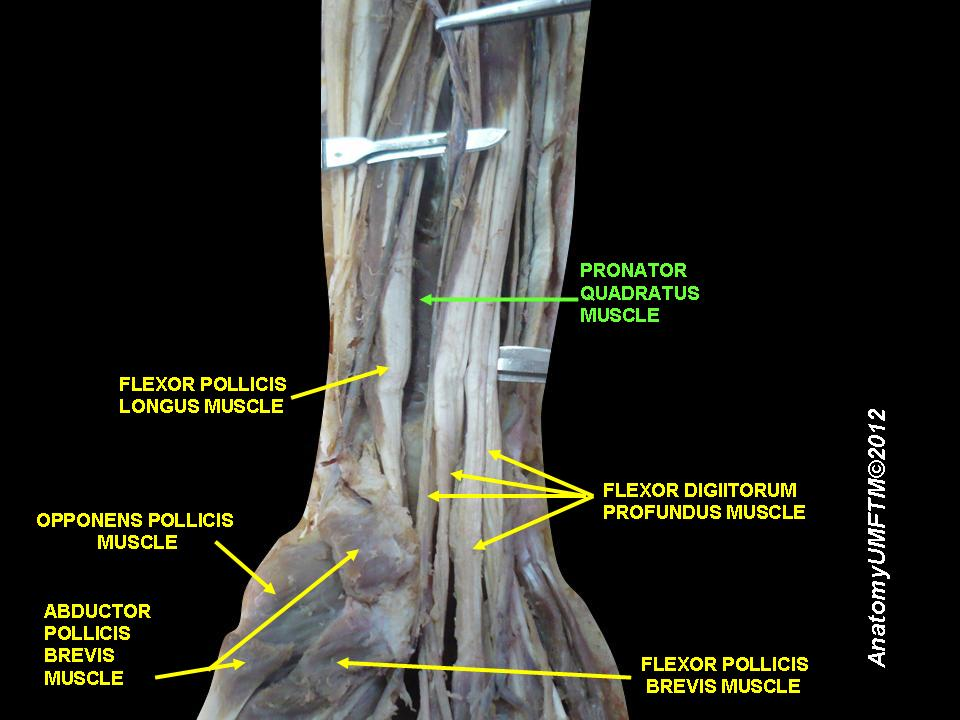
Pronator quadratus muscle

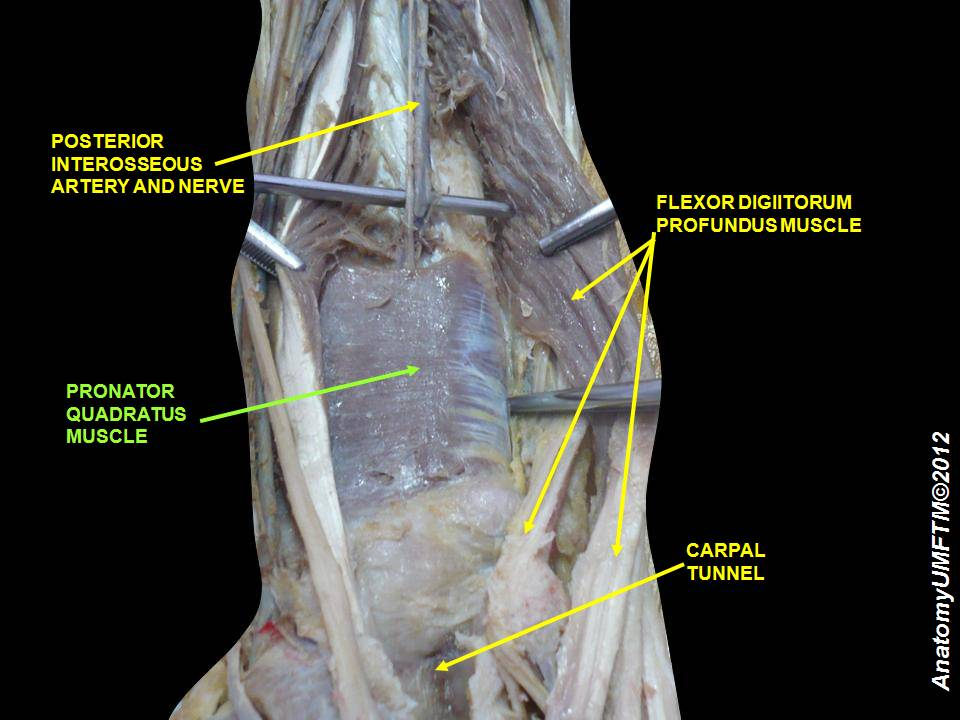
Pronator quadratus muscle

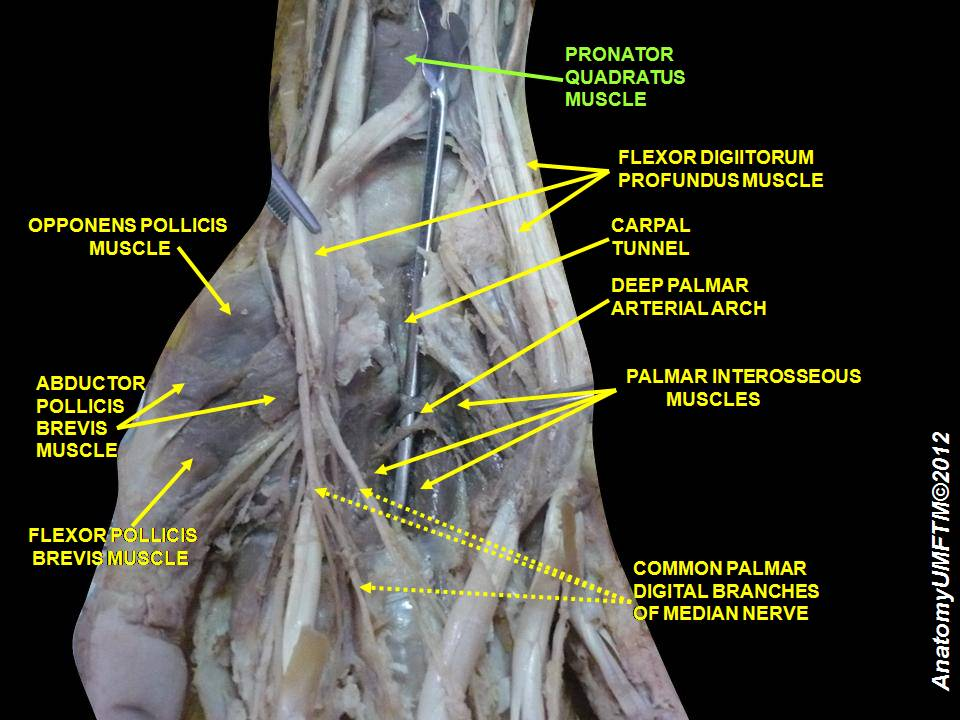
Pronator quadratus muscle
