= Venography =

X-ray imaging method for veins

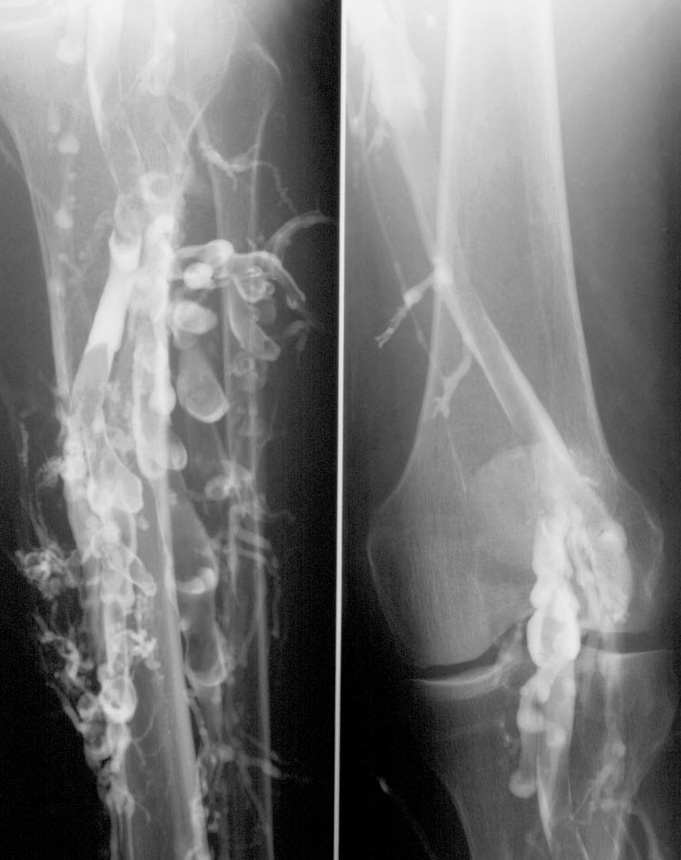
- Venography in a patient with deep vein thrombosis
- ICD-9-CM: 88.6
- MeSH: D010690
- OPS-301 code: 3-61
- MedlinePlus: 007283

Venography (also called phlebography or ascending phlebography) is a procedure in which an X-ray of the veins, a venogram, is taken after a special dye is injected into the bone marrow or veins. The dye has to be injected constantly via a catheter, making it an invasive procedure. Normally the catheter is inserted by the groin and moved to the appropriate site by navigating through the vascular system.

Contrast venography is the gold standard for judging diagnostic imaging methods for deep vein thrombosis; although, because of its cost, invasiveness, and other limitations, this test is rarely performed.

Venography can also be used to distinguish blood clots from obstructions in the veins, to evaluate congenital vein problems, to see how the deep leg vein valves are working, or to identify a vein for arterial bypass grafting.

Areas of the venous system that can be investigated include the lower extremities, the inferior vena cava, and the upper extremities.

The United States National Institute of Health says the following about varicose veins, "they cause concern and distress on a large scale, most of which can be dealt with by good explanation and reassurance, or by a variety of treatments which are evolving rapidly at present."

== Peripheral venography ==
=== Upper limb ===
Upper limb venography is indicated in those who has upper limb oedema, to demonstrate site of occlusion and stenosis in the veins, and superior vena cava obstruction. Low osmolar contrast medium with concentration of 300 mg/ml is used. The subject lies down in supine position. An 18G butterfly needle is inserted into the median cubital vein. Cephalic vein is not used because it bypasses the axillary vein. Then, 30 ml of the contrast is injected through the butterfly needle and spot images are taken. Alternatively, digital subtraction angiography can be used at a fram rate of 1 frame per second.

=== Lower limb ===
Lower limb venography is indicated in deep vein thrombosis, oedema with unknown cause, and congenital abnormality of the venous system. Less frequently it is used to demonstrate the incompetent valves of perforating veins. Doppler ultrasound is preferable rather than venography to access the competence of the veins. Local sepsis of the lower limbs is contraindicated for this procedure. Low osmolar contrast agent with concentration of 240 mg/ml is preferable in this study. Before the procedure, oedematous leg, if any, should be elevated overnight to reduce the oedema. The subject is tilted 40 degrees with head higher than the legs, in order to delay the flow of contrast medium from the foot to the thigh. Tourniquet is applied over the ankle to occlude the superficial veins of the leg. Anterior tibial vein is also occluded. 19G butterfly needle is inserted into dorsum of foot at a distance from the ankle. 40 ml of contrast medium is injected by hand. Spot films are then taken. Then, another 20 ml of contrast medium is injected. Valsalva maneuver is performed to delay the flow of contrast medium into the thigh. Then, the subject is tilted in head down position and Valsalva maneuver is relaxed for contrast medium to flow into the pelvis. Alternatively, femoral vein can be pressed during the tilting and released after tilting is completed to achieve the same effect. At the end of the procedure, the needle is flushed with normal saline to reduce the chances of getting phlebitis due to administration of contrast medium.

== See also ==
- Chronic venous insufficiency
