= Median antebrachial vein =

Vein draining the venous plexus on the palmar surface of the hand

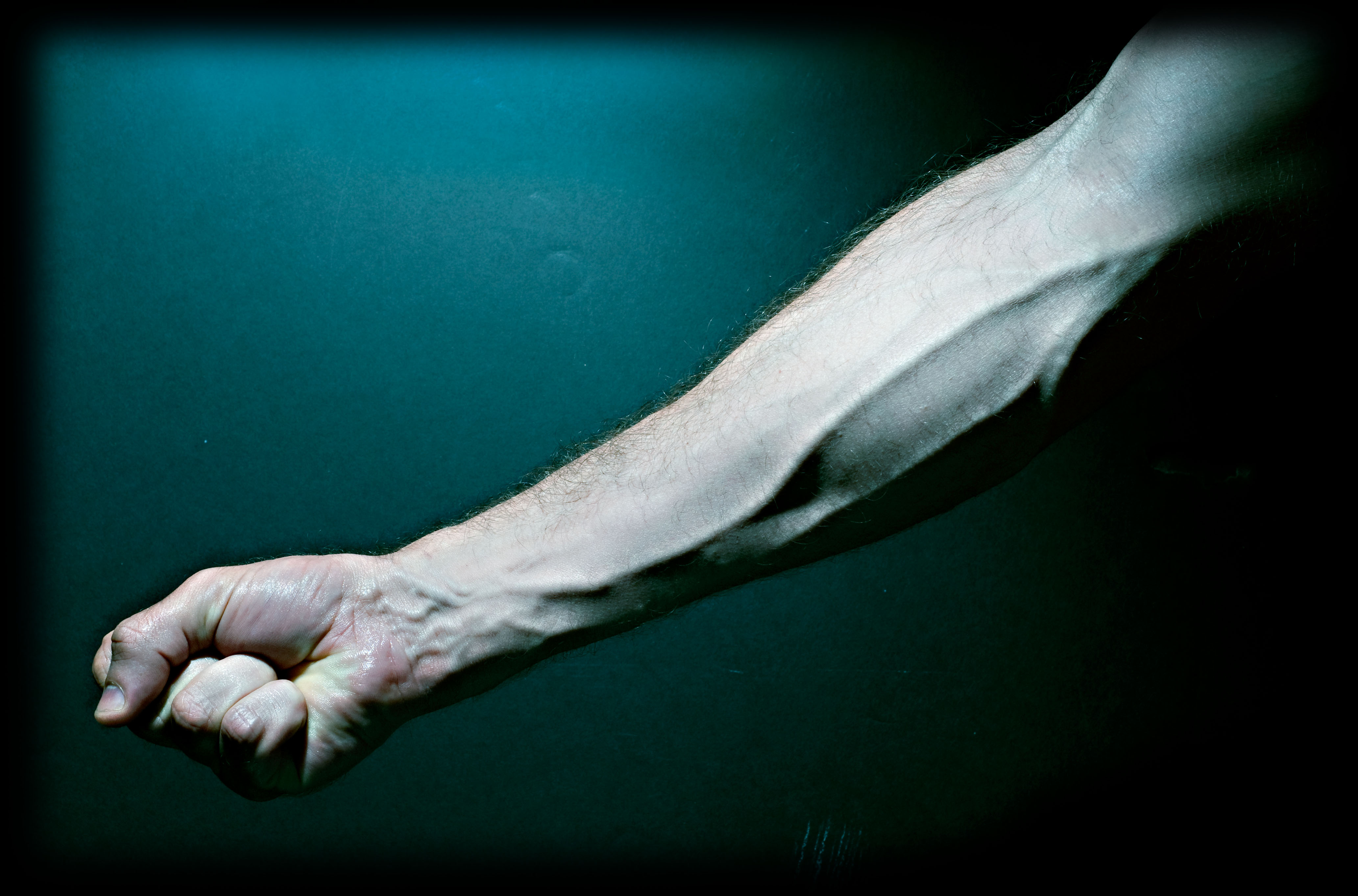
- A prominent median antebrachial vein.

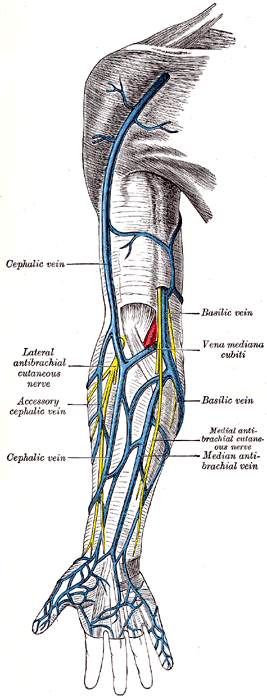
- Superficial veins of the upper limb. (Median antebrachial vein—spelled with an "i"—labeled at bottom right.)

Details
- Source: Palmar venous plexus
- Drains to: Basilic vein, median cubital vein

Identifiers
- Latin: v. mediana antebrachii, v. intermedia antebrachii
- TA98: A12.3.08.020
- TA2: 4981
- FMA: 22967

The median antebrachial vein, also known as median vein of forearm, is a superficial vein of the (anterior) forearm. It arises from - and drains - the superficial palmar venous arch, ascending superficially along the anterior forearm before ending by opening into the median cubital vein near the junction with the basilic vein within the cubital fossa; alternately, it may fork distal to the elbow and proceed to drain into both aforementioned veins. A bifurcation of the median antebrachial vein produces the (medial) intermediate basilic vein and the (lateral) intermediate cephalic vein; the two veins produced by such a split may replace the median cubital vein.
