= Deltopectoral =

Deltopectoral may refer to:

- Clavipectoral triangle, also known as the deltopectoral triangle
- Deltopectoral groove
- Deltopectoral lymph nodes
