= Median nerve palsy =

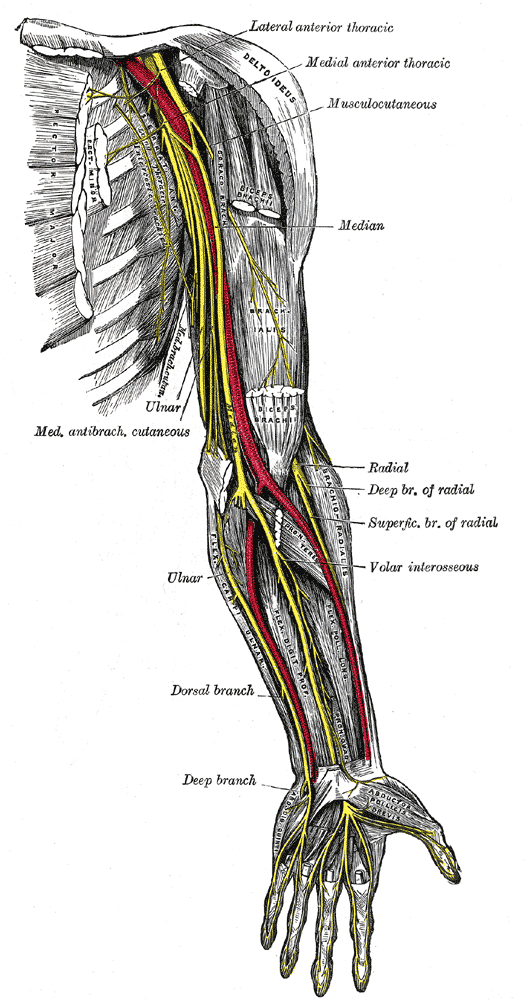
- Diagram from Gray's anatomy, depicting the nerves of the upper extremity, amongst others the median nerve.
- Specialty: Neurology

Injuries to the arm, forearm or wrist area can lead to various nerve disorders. One such disorder is median nerve palsy. The median nerve controls the majority of the muscles in the forearm. It controls abduction of the thumb, flexion of hand at wrist, flexion of digital phalanx of the fingers, is the sensory nerve for the first three fingers, etc. Because of this major role of the median nerve, it is also called the eye of the hand. If the median nerve is damaged, the ability to abduct and oppose the thumb may be lost due to paralysis of the thenar muscles. Various other symptoms can occur which may be repaired through surgery and tendon transfers. Tendon transfers have been very successful in restoring motor function and improving functional outcomes in patients with median nerve palsy.

== Signs and symptoms ==
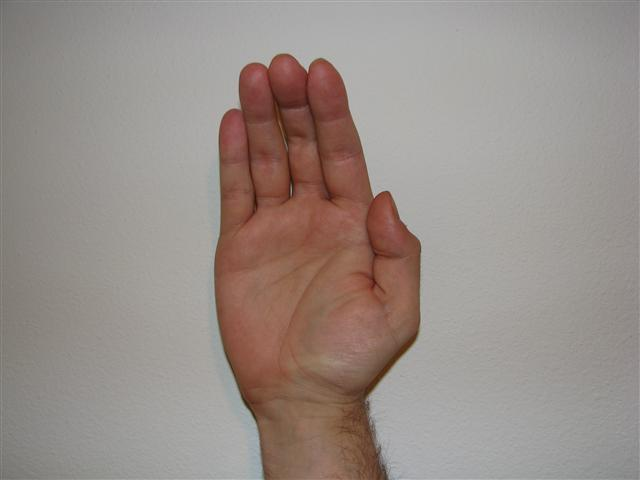
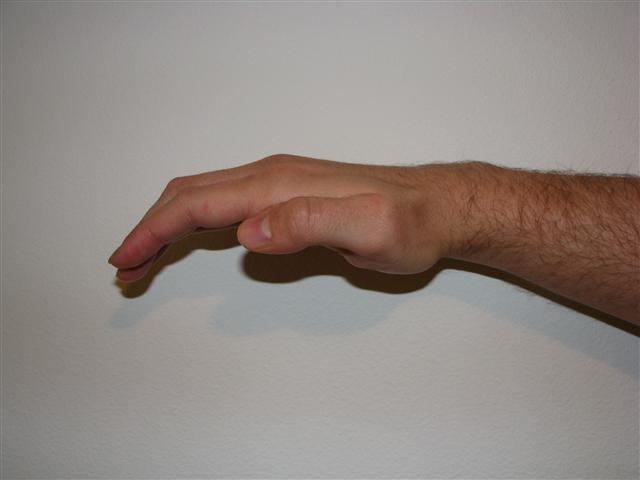
Ape hand deformity
- Lack of ability to abduct and oppose the thumb due to paralysis of the thenar muscles. This is called "ape-hand deformity".
- Sensory loss in the thumbs, index fingers, long fingers, and the radial aspect of the ring fingers.
- Weakness in forearm pronation and wrist and finger flexion
- Activities of daily living such as brushing teeth, tying shoes, making phone calls, turning door knobs and writing, may become difficult with a median nerve injury.

== Causes ==
Median nerve palsy is often caused by deep, penetrating injuries to the arm, forearm, or wrist. It may also occur from blunt force trauma or neuropathy.

Median nerve palsy can be separated into 2 subsections—high and low median nerve palsy. High MNP involves lesions at the elbow and forearm areas. Low median nerve palsy results from lesions at the wrist. Compression at the different levels of the median nerve produce variable symptoms and/or syndromes. The areas are:

- Underneath Struthers' ligament
- Passing by the bicipital aponeurosis (also known as lacertus fibrosus)
- Between the two heads of the pronator teres
- Compression in the carpal tunnel causes carpal tunnel syndrome

== Anatomy ==
The median nerve receives fibers from roots C6, C7, C8, T1 and sometimes C5. It is formed in the axilla by a branch from the medial and lateral chords of the brachial plexus, which are on either side of the axillary artery and fuse together to create the nerve anterior to the artery.

The median nerve is closely related to the brachial artery within the arm. The nerve enters the cubital fossa medial to the brachialis tendon and passes between the two heads of the pronator teres. It then gives off the anterior interosseus branch in the pronator teres.

The nerve continues down the forearm between the flexor digitorum profundus and the flexor digitorum superficialis. The median nerve emerges to lie between the flexor digitorum superficialis and the flexor carpi ulnaris muscles which are just above the wrist. At this position, the nerve gives off the palmar cutaneous branch that supplies the skin of the central portion of the palm.

The nerve continues through the carpal tunnel into the hand, lying in the carpal tunnel anterior and lateral to the tendons of the flexor digitorum superficialis. Once in the hand, the nerve splits into a muscular branch and palmar digital branches. The muscular branch supplies the thenar eminence while the palmar digital branch supplies sensation to the palmar aspect of the lateral 3 1/2 digits and the lateral two lumbricals.

== Diagnosis ==
Because lesions to different areas of the median nerve produce similar symptoms, clinicians perform a complete motor and sensory diagnosis along the nerve course. Decreased values of nerve conduction studies are used as indicators of nerve compression and may aid in determining the localization of compression.

Palpation above the elbow joint may reveal a bony consistency. Radiography images may show an abnormal bony spur outgrowth (supracondyloid process) just proximal to the elbow joint. Attached fibrous tissue (Struthers' ligament) may compress the median nerve as it passes underneath the process. This is also known as supracondylar process syndrome. Compression at this point may also occur without the bony spur; in this case, aponeurotic tissue found at the location of where Struthers' ligament should be is responsible for the compression.

If patients mention reproduction of symptoms to the forearm during elbow flexion of 120–130 degrees with the forearm in maximal supination, then the lesion may be localized to the area underneath the lacertus fibrosus (also known as bicipital aponeurosis). This is sometimes misdiagnosed as elbow strain and medial or lateral epicondylitis.

A lesion to the upper arm area, just proximal to where motor branches of forearm flexors originate, is diagnosed if the patient is unable to make a fist. More specifically, the patient's index and middle finger cannot flex at the MCP joint, while the thumb usually is unable to oppose. This is known as hand of benediction or Pope's blessing hand. Another test is the bottle sign—the patient is unable to close all their fingers around a cylindrical object.

Carpal tunnel syndrome (CTS) is caused by compression of the median nerve as it passes under the carpal tunnel. Nerve conduction velocity tests through the hand are used to diagnose CTS. Physical diagnostic tests include the Phalen maneuver or Phalen test and Tinel's sign. To relieve symptoms, patients may describe a motion similar to "shaking a thermometer", another indication of CTS.

Pronator teres syndrome (also known as pronator syndrome) is compression of the median nerve between the two heads of the pronator teres muscle. The Pronator teres test is an indication of the syndrome—the patient reports pain when attempting to pronate the forearm against resistance while extending the elbow simultaneously. The physician may notice an enlarged pronator teres muscle. Tinel's sign the area around the pronator teres heads should be positive. The key to discerning this syndrome from carpal tunnel syndrome is the absence of pain while sleeping. More recent literature collectively diagnose median nerve palsy occurring from the elbow to the forearm as pronator teres syndrome.

In uncooperative patients, the skin wrinkle test offers a pain-free way to identify denervation of the fingers. After submersion in water for 5 minutes, normal fingers will become wrinkled, whereas denervated fingers will not.

In "Ape hand deformity", the thenar muscles become paralyzed due to impingement and are subsequently flattened. This hand deformity is not by itself an individual diagnosis; it is seen only after the thenar muscles have atrophied. While the adductor pollicis remains intact, the flattening of the muscles causes the thumb to become adducted and laterally rotated. The opponens pollicis causes the thumb to flex and rotate medially, leaving the thumb unable to oppose. Carpal tunnel syndrome can result in thenar muscle paralysis which can then lead to ape hand deformity if left untreated. Ape hand deformity can also be seen in the hand of benediction deformity.

The Anterior Interosseus Nerve (AIN), a branch of the median nerve, only accounts for the movement of the fingers in hand and does not have any sensory capabilities. Therefore, the AIN syndrome is purely neuropathic. AINS is considered as an extremely rare condition because it accounts for less than 1% of neuropathies in the upper limb. Patients with this syndrome have impaired distal interphalangeal joint, because of which they are unable to pinch anything or make and "OK" sign with their index finger and thumb. The syndrome can either happen from pinched nerve, or even dislocation of the elbow.

== Prevention ==
One way to prevent this injury from occurring is to be informed and educated about the risks involved in hurting your wrist and hand. If patients do have median nerve palsy, occupational therapy or wearing a splint can help reduce the pain and further damage. Wearing a dynamic splint, which pulls the thumb into opposition, will help prevent an excess in deformity. This splint can also assist in function and help the fingers flex towards the thumb. Stretching and the use of C-splints can also assist in prevention of further damage and deformity. These two methods can help in the degree of movement the thumb can have. While it is impossible to prevent trauma to your arms and wrist, patients can reduce the amount of compression by maintaining proper form during repetitive activities. Furthermore, strengthening and increasing flexibility reduces the risk of nerve compression.

== Treatment ==
Depending on the severity of the lesion, physicians may recommend either conservative treatment or surgery. The first step is simply to rest and modify daily activities that aggravate the symptoms. Patients may be prescribed anti-inflammatory drugs, Physical or Occupational therapy, splints for the elbow and wrists, and corticosteroid injections as well. This is the most common treatment for CTS. Especially involving compression at the wrist, such as in CTS, it is possible to recover without treatment. Physical therapy can help build muscle strength and braces or splints help recover. In pronator teres syndrome, specifically, immobilization of the elbow and mobility exercise within a pain-free range are initially prescribed. However, if the patient is not relieved of symptoms after a usual 2 to 3 month refractory period, then decompression surgery may be required. Surgery involves excising the tissue or removing parts of the bone compressing the nerve.

Many tendon transfers have been shown to restore opposition to the thumb and provide thumb and finger flexion. In order to have optimal results the individual needs to follow the following principles of tendon transfer: normal tissue equilibrium, movable joints, and a scar-free bed. If these requirements are met then certain factors need to be considered such as matching up the lost muscle mass, fiber length, and cross-sectional area and then pick out muscle-tendon units of similar size, strength, and potential excursion.

For patients with low median nerve palsy, it has been shown that the flexor digitorum superficialis of the long and ring fingers or the wrist extensors best approximate the force and motion that is required to restore full thumb opposition and strength. This type of transfer is the preferred method for median nerve palsy when both strength and motion are required. In situations when only thumb mobility is desired, the extensor indicis proprius is an ideal transfer.

For high median nerve palsy, the brachioradialis or the extensor carpi radialis longus transfer is more appropriate to restore lost thumb flexion and side-to-side transfer of the flexor digitorum profundus of the index finger are generally sufficient. To restore independent flexion of the index finger could be performed by using the pronator teres or extensor carpi radialis ulnaris tendon muscle units. All of the mentioned transfers are generally quite successful because they combine a proper direction of action, pulley location, and tendon insertion.

=== Rehabilitation ===
In high median nerve palsy patients, recovery time varies from as early as four months to 2.5 years. Initially, patients are immobilized in a neutral position of the forearm and elbow flexed at 90° in order to prevent further injury. Additionally, gentle exercises and soft tissue massage are applied. The next goal is strengthening and flexibility, usually involving wrist extension and flexion; however, it is important not to overuse the muscles in order to prevent re-injury. If surgery is required, post operative therapy initially involves decreasing pain and sensitivity to the incision area. Adequate grip and elbow strength must be achieved before returning to pre-operative activity.

== Epidemiology ==
- The number of discharges related to median nerve injuries decreased from 3,402 in 1993 to 2,737 in 2006.
- The mean hospital charges in nominal dollars increased from $9,257 to $27,962 between 1993 and 2006.
- 37.1% of patients in 2006 presenting with median nerve injuries needed acute repair.
- Median nerve injuries were the least likely to be admitted to the emergency room out of all peripheral nerve injuries (median nerve 68.89%, ulnar nerve 71.3% and radial nerve 77.06%).
- The highest percentage of patients discharged with median nerve injuries in 2006 were between the ages of 18 and 44.
- Out of all the patients in 2006 presenting with median nerve injuries, 77.76% were male and 21.75% were female.

== See also ==
- Peripheral nerve injury
- Peripheral neuropathy
