= Ape hand deformity =

- Other names: Simian hand
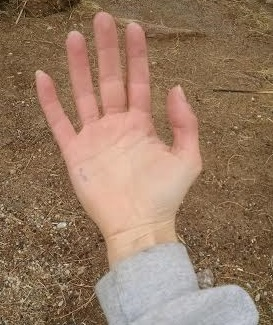
- Ape hand deformity

Ape hand deformity is a deformity in humans who cannot move the thumb away from the rest of the hand. It describes an inability to oppose the thumb, which is often accompanied by limited thumb abduction. Abduction of the thumb refers to the specific capacity to orient the thumb perpendicularly to the ventral (palmar) surface of the hand; opposition refers specifically to the ability to "swing" the first metacarpal such that the tip of the thumb may touch the distal end of the fifth digit. Ape hand deformity is caused by damage to the distal median nerve (also called a median claw lesion), and subsequent loss of opponens pollicis muscle function. The name "ape hand deformity" is misleading, as some apes do have opposable thumbs.

It can occur with an injury of the median nerve either at the elbow or the wrist, impairing the thenar muscles and opponens pollicis muscle.

Ape hand deformity is one aspect of median nerve palsy, which is usually caused by deep injuries to the arm, forearm, and wrist area.

== Additional images ==
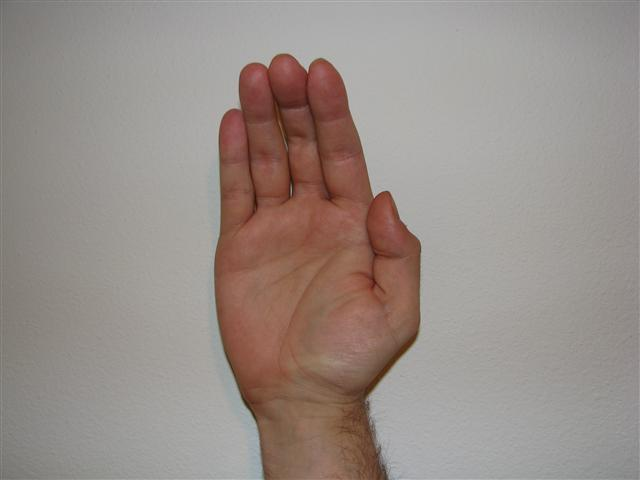
Ape Hand Deformity

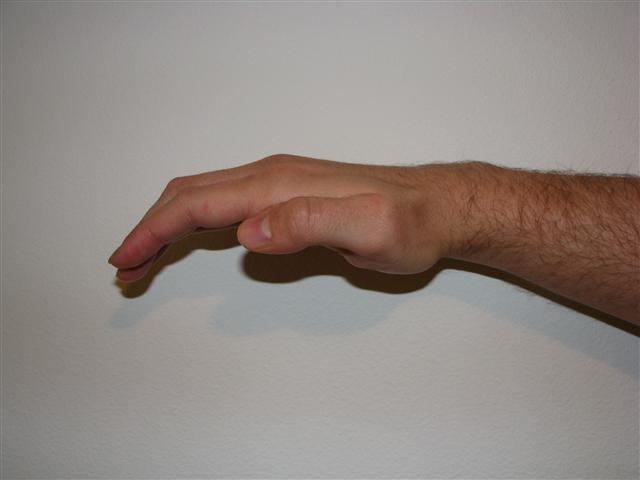
Ape Hand Deformity

Ape hand caused by median and ulnar nerve lesions.

== See also ==
- Recurrent branch of the median nerve
- Median nerve palsy
