= Clavipectoral triangle =

Anatomical region

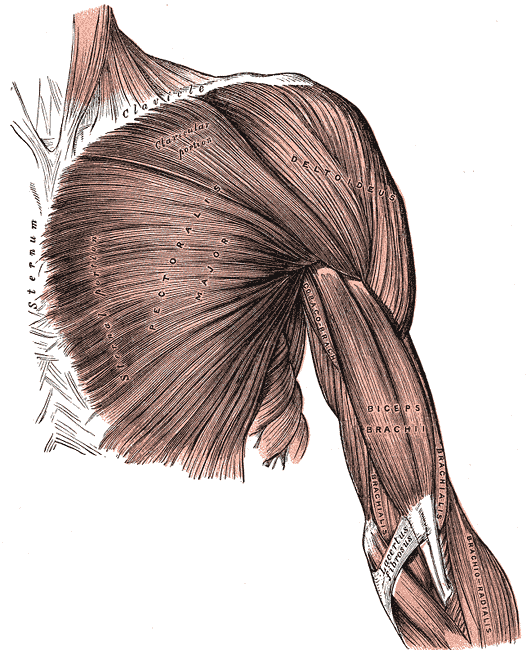
- Superficial muscles of the chest and front of the arm.

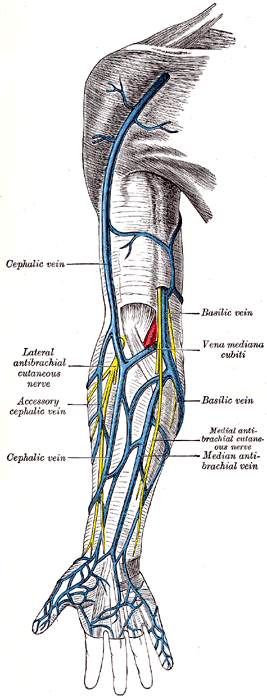
- Superficial veins of the upper limb.

Details

Identifiers
- Latin: trigonum clavipectorale
- TA98: A01.2.03.004
- TA2: 249

The clavipectoral triangle (also known as the deltopectoral triangle) is an anatomical region found in humans and other animals. It is bordered by the following structures:

- Clavicle (superiorly)
- Lateral border of Pectoralis Major (medially)
- Medial border of Deltoid muscle (laterally)

It contains the cephalic vein, and deltopectoral fascia, which is a layer of deep fascia that invests the three structures that make up the border of the triangle. The deltoid branch of the thoracoacromial artery also passes through this triangle, giving branches to both the deltoid and pectoralis major muscles.

The subclavian vein and the subclavian artery may be accessed via this triangle, as they are deep to it.

== Clinical significance ==
- Palpation of coracoid process of scapula

The coracoid process of the scapula is not subcutaneous; It is covered by the anterior border of the deltoid. However, the tip of the coracoid process can be felt on deep palpation on the lateral aspect of the clavipectoral triangle. The coracoid process is used as a bony landmark when performing a brachial plexus block. Position of coracoid process is significant for diagnosing dislocations as well.

== See also ==
- Deltopectoral groove
