= Vascularity =

Presence of prominent superficial veins on the skin

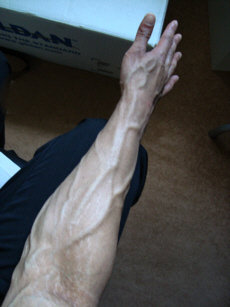
Vascularity in an adult forearm

Vascularity, in bodybuilding, is the condition of having many highly visible, prominent, and often extensively-ramified superficial veins. The skin appears "thin"—sometimes virtually transparent—due to an extreme reduction of subcutaneous fat, allowing for maximum muscle definition.

Vascularity is enhanced by extremely low body fat (usually below 10%) and low retained water, as well as the muscle engorgement ("pump") and venous distension accentuated by the vigorous flexing and potentially hazardous Valsalva effect which characterize competitive posing. Genetics and androgenic hormones will affect vascularity, as will ambient temperature. Additionally, although some bodybuilders develop arterial hypertension from performance-enhancing substances and practices, "high" venous pressure—being an order of magnitude lower than that of arteries— neither causes nor is caused by vascularity. Some bodybuilders use topical vasodilators to increase blood flow to the skin as well. Although historically controversial, vascularity is a highly-sought-after aesthetic for many male bodybuilders, but less so for female bodybuilders, where the target aesthetic is relatively more towards aesthetic symmetry than extreme development.

Bodybuilders or athletes sometimes dehydrate themselves a few days before a competition or show to achieve this so-called "ripped," vascular look. Self-dehydration is not recommended by medical professionals, as the negative and sometimes-fatal effects of the resultant water-electrolyte imbalances are well documented.
