= Cubital fossa =

Human elbow pit

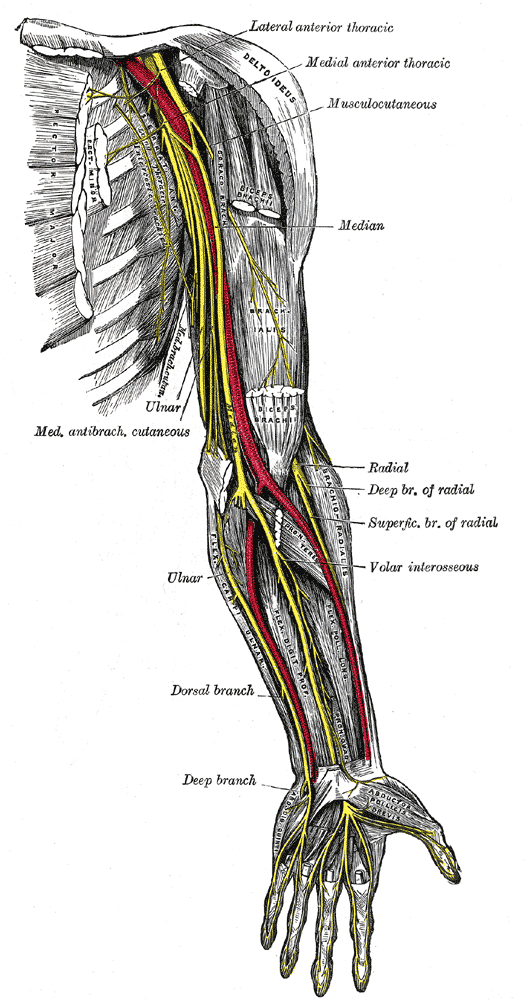
- Ulnar and radial arteries. Deep view.

Details

Identifiers
- Latin: fossa cubitalis
- TA98: A01.2.07.010
- TA2: 291
- FMA: 39848

The cubital fossa, antecubital fossa, chelidon, inside of elbow, crook of the arm, or, humorously, wagina or cough-into, is the area on the anterior side of the upper part between the arm and forearm of a human or other hominid animals. It lies anteriorly to the elbow (antecubital) (Latin cubitus) when in standard anatomical position. The cubital fossa is a triangular area having three borders.

== Boundaries ==
- superior (proximal) boundary – an imaginary horizontal line connecting the medial epicondyle of the humerus to the lateral epicondyle of the humerus
- medial (ulnar) boundary – lateral border of pronator teres muscle originating from the medial epicondyle of the humerus.
- lateral (radial) boundary – medial border of brachioradialis muscle originating from the lateral supraepicondylar ridge of the humerus.
- apex – it is directed inferiorly, and is formed by the meeting point of the lateral and medial boundaries
- superficial boundary (roof) – skin, superficial fascia containing the median cubital vein, the lateral cutaneous nerve of the forearm and the medial cutaneous nerve of the forearm, deep fascia reinforced by the bicipital aponeurosis (a sheet of tendon-like material that arises from the tendon of the biceps brachii)
- deep boundary (floor) – brachialis and supinator muscles

== Contents ==
The cubital fossa contains four main vertical structures (from lateral to medial):

- The radial nerve passes underneath the brachioradialis muscle where it divides into deep and superficial branches. It is not always considered part of the cubital fossa but is in the vicinity.
- The biceps brachii tendon
- The brachial artery. The artery usually bifurcates near the apex (inferior part) of the cubital fossa into the radial artery (superficial) and ulnar artery (deeper)
- The median nerve

The ulnar nerve is also in the area, but is not in the cubital fossa; it occupies a groove on the posterior aspect of the medial epicondyle of the humerus.

Several veins are also in the area (for example, the median cubital vein, cephalic vein, and basilic vein) but these are usually considered superficial to the cubital fossa, and not part of its contents.

From lateral to medial, the order of the contents within the cubital fossa can be described by the acronym TAN: tendon, artery, nerve

== Clinical aspects ==
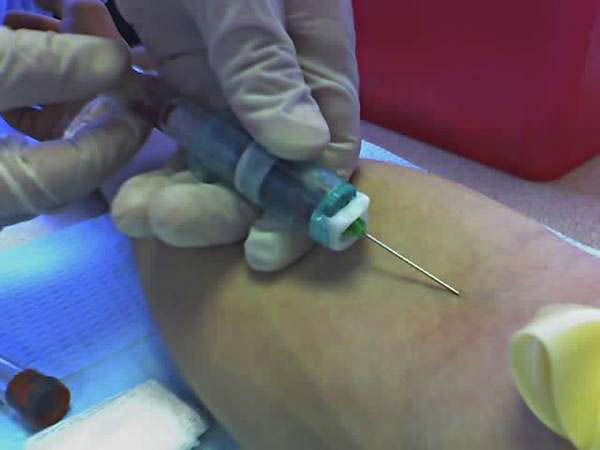
A sample of blood being taken from the median cubital vein via the cubital fossa with a vacutainer for a blood test.

Like other flexion surfaces of large joints (groin, popliteal fossa, armpit and essentially the anterior part of the neck), it is an area where blood vessels and nerves pass relatively superficially, and with an increased amount of lymph nodes.

During blood pressure measurements, the stethoscope is placed over the brachial artery in the cubital fossa. The artery runs medial to the biceps tendon. The brachial pulse may be palpated in the cubital fossa just medial to the tendon.

The area just superficial to the cubital fossa is often used for venous access (phlebotomy) in procedures such as injections and obtaining samples for blood tests. A number of superficial veins can cross this region. It may also be used for the insertion of a peripherally inserted central catheter.

Historically, during bloodletting, the bicipital aponeurosis (the ceiling of the cubital fossa) was known as the "grace of God tendon" because it separated and protected the more important contents of the fossa such as the brachial artery and the median nerve.

Statistically, the antecubital fossa is the least tender region for peripheral intravenous access, although it provides a greater risk for venous thrombosis.

== Additional images ==
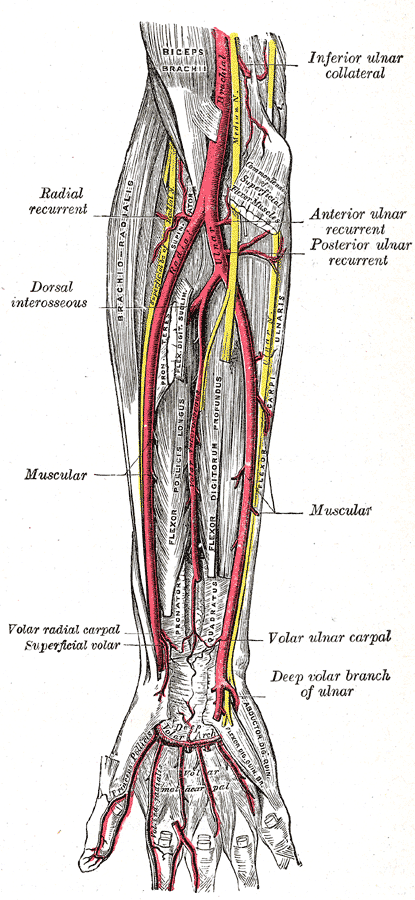

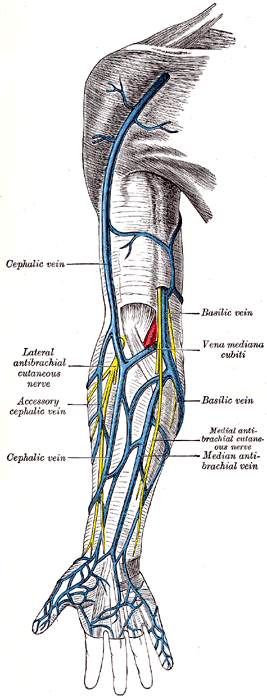
Superficial veins of the upper limb.

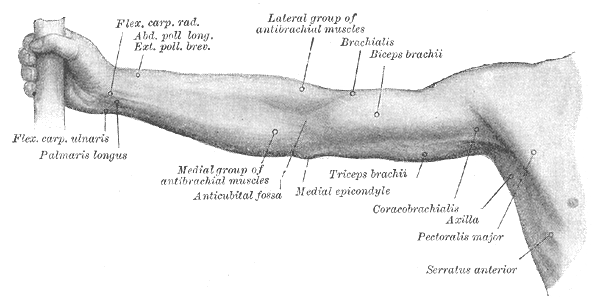
Front of right upper extremity.

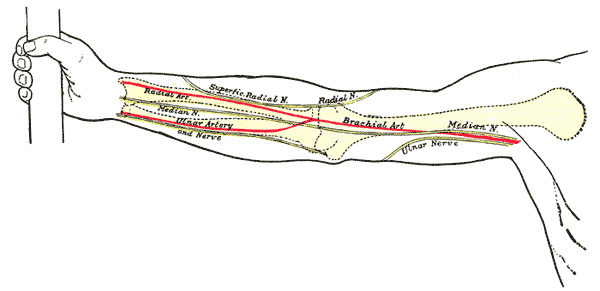
Front of right upper extremity, showing surface markings for bones, arteries, and nerves.

== See also ==
- Cubital tunnel
- Median cubital vein
- Peripherally inserted central catheter
