= Basilic vein =

Large blood vessel in the arm

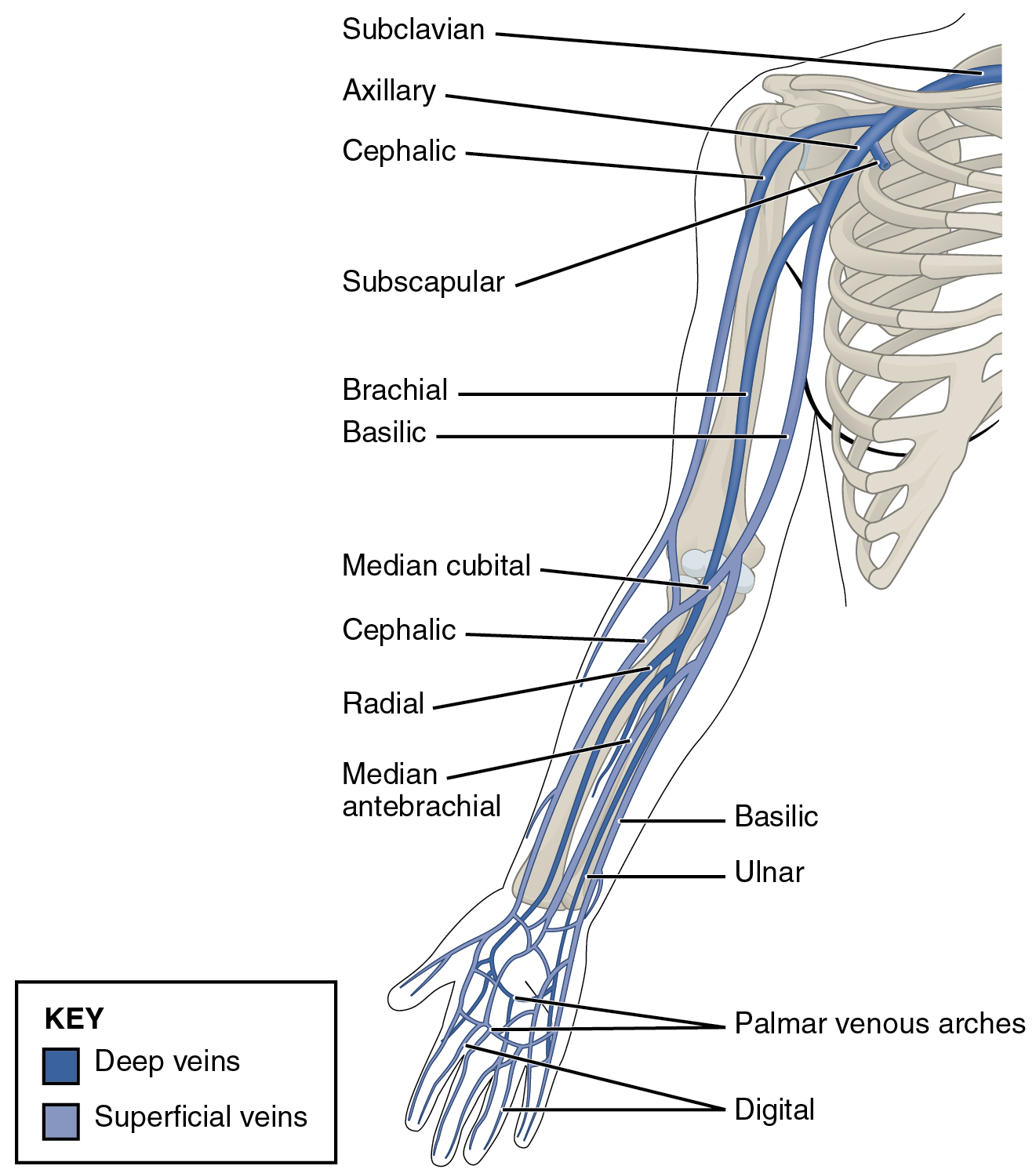
- Veins of the upper limb

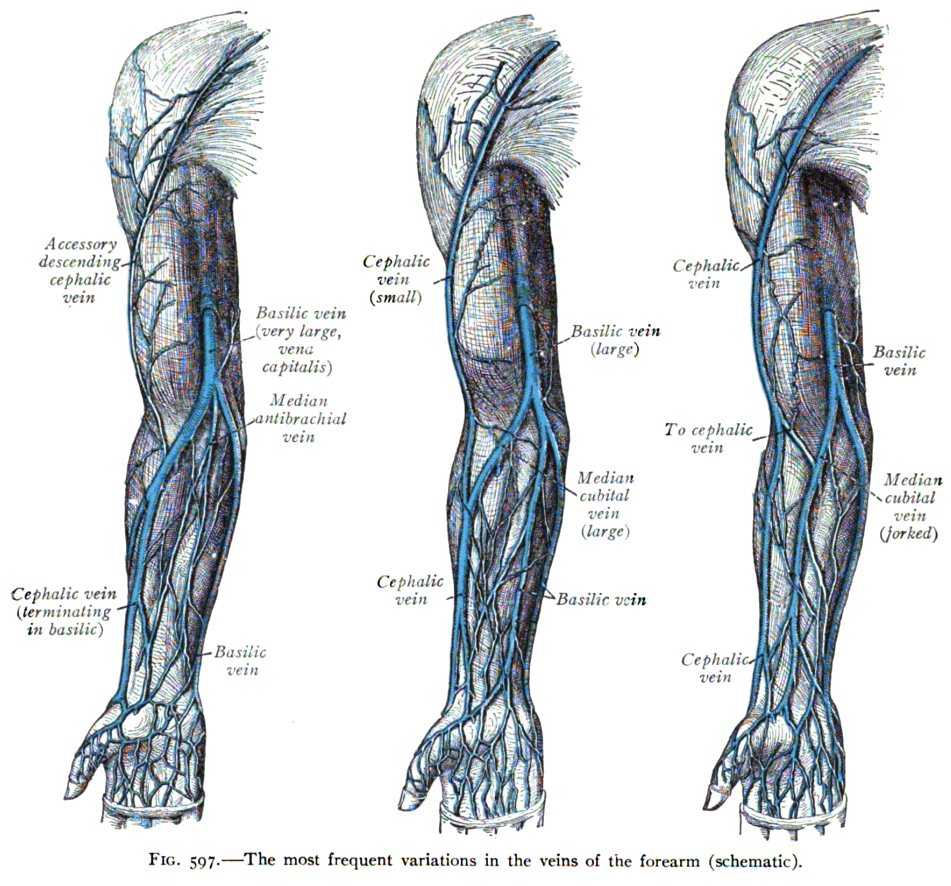
- The most frequent variations of the veins of the forearm (schematic).

Details
- Source: Dorsal venous network of hand
- Drains to: Axillary vein, median cubital vein

Identifiers
- Latin: vena basilica
- TA98: A12.3.08.018
- TA2: 4979
- FMA: 22908

The basilic vein is a large superficial vein of the upper limb that helps drain parts of the hand and forearm. It originates on the medial (ulnar) side of the dorsal venous network of the hand and travels up the base of the forearm, where its course is generally visible through the skin as it travels in the subcutaneous fat and fascia lying superficial to the muscles. The basilic vein terminates by uniting with the brachial veins to form the axillary vein.

== Anatomy ==
=== Course ===
As it ascends the medial side of the biceps in the arm proper (between the elbow and shoulder), the basilic vein normally perforates the brachial fascia (deep fascia) in the middle of the medial bicipital groove, and runs upwards medial to the brachial artery to the lower border of teres major, continuing as the axillary vein.

=== Tributaries and anastomoses ===
Near the region anterior to the cubital fossa (in the bend of the elbow joint), the basilic vein usually communicates with the cephalic vein (the other large superficial vein of the upper extremity) via the median cubital vein. The layout of superficial veins in the forearm is highly variable from person to person, and there is a profuse network of unnamed superficial veins that the basilic vein communicates with.

Around the inferior border of the teres major muscle and just proximal to the basilic vein's termination, the anterior and posterior circumflex humeral veins drain into it.

== Clinical significance ==
=== Venipuncture ===
Along with other superficial veins in the forearm, the basilic vein is an acceptable site for venipuncture. Nevertheless, IV nurses sometimes dub the basilic vein "the virgin vein", since with the arm typically supinated during phlebotomy the basilic vein below the elbow becomes awkward to access, and is therefore infrequently used.

=== Venous grafts ===
Vascular surgeons sometimes utilize the basilic vein to create an AV (arteriovenous) fistula or AV graft for hemodialysis access in patients with kidney failure.

== Additional images ==
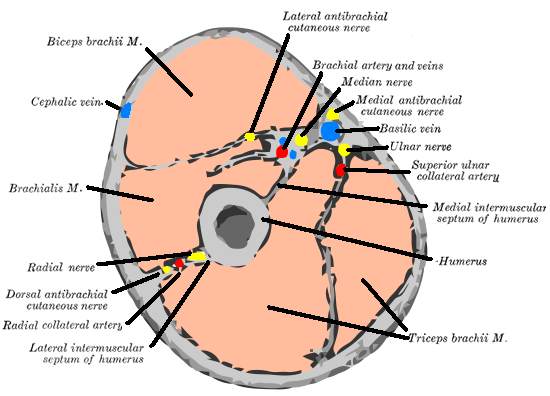
Cross-section through the middle of upper arm

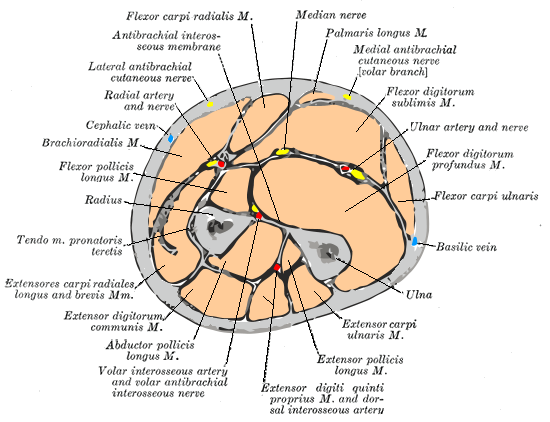
Cross-section through the middle of the forearm

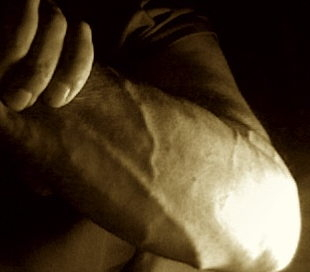
Moderate-sized basilic vein of forearm (adult male): Estimated lumen diameter 6.5 mm. Anatomically typical branching pattern.

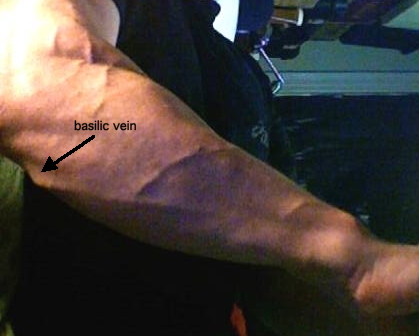
Basilic vein, muscular right forearm.

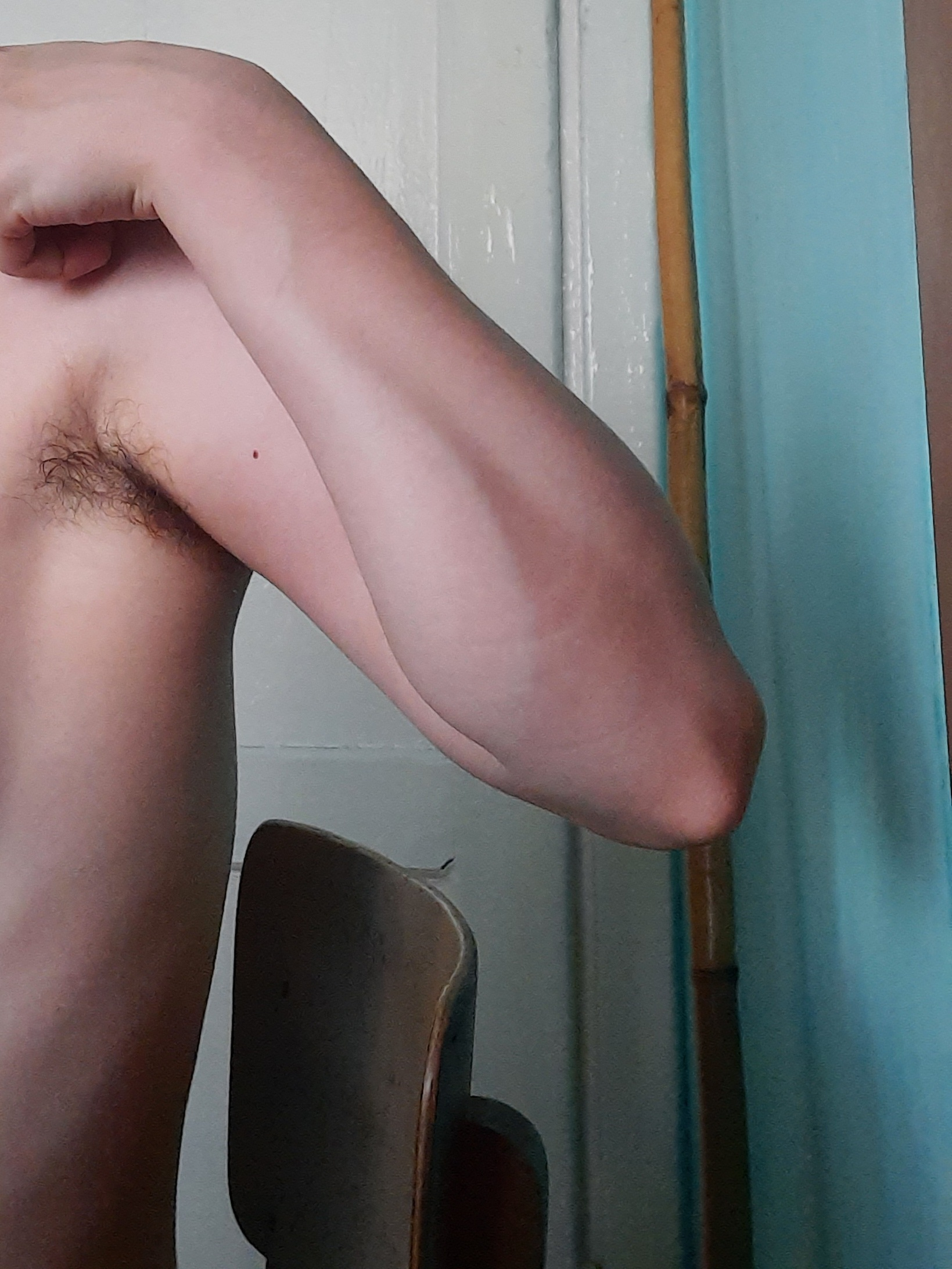
Basilic vein, right forearm (adolescent).

Dissection images
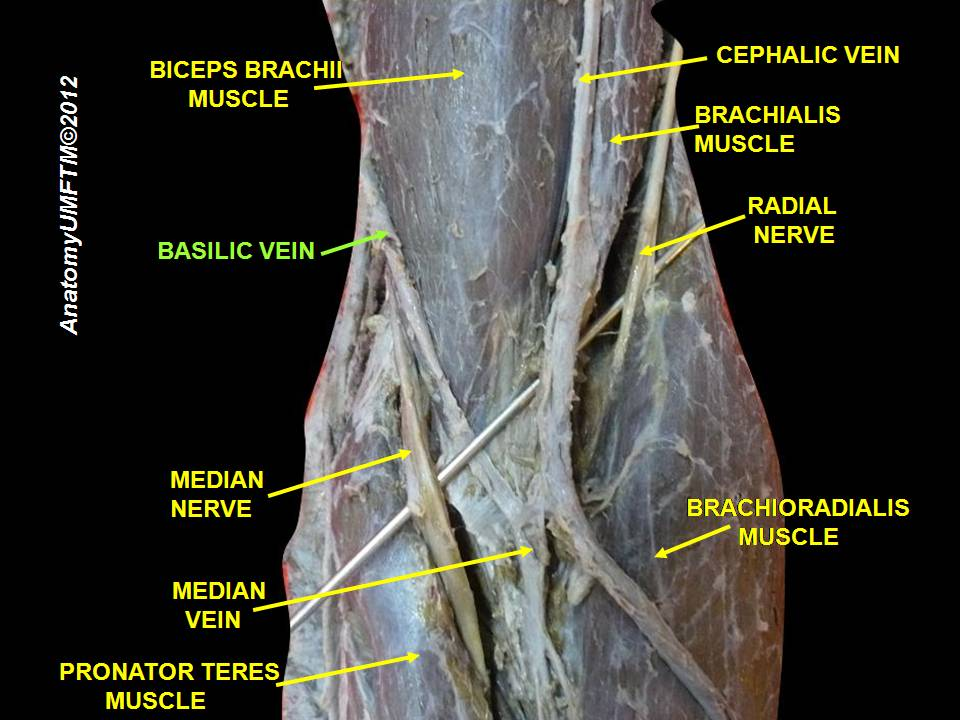
Basilic vein

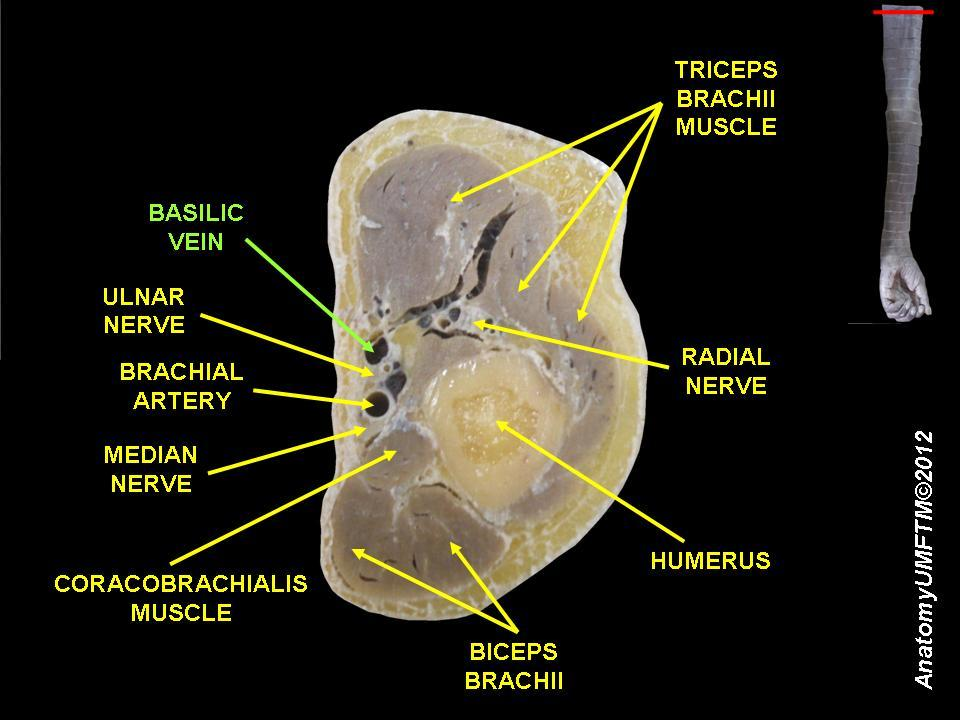
Basilic vein

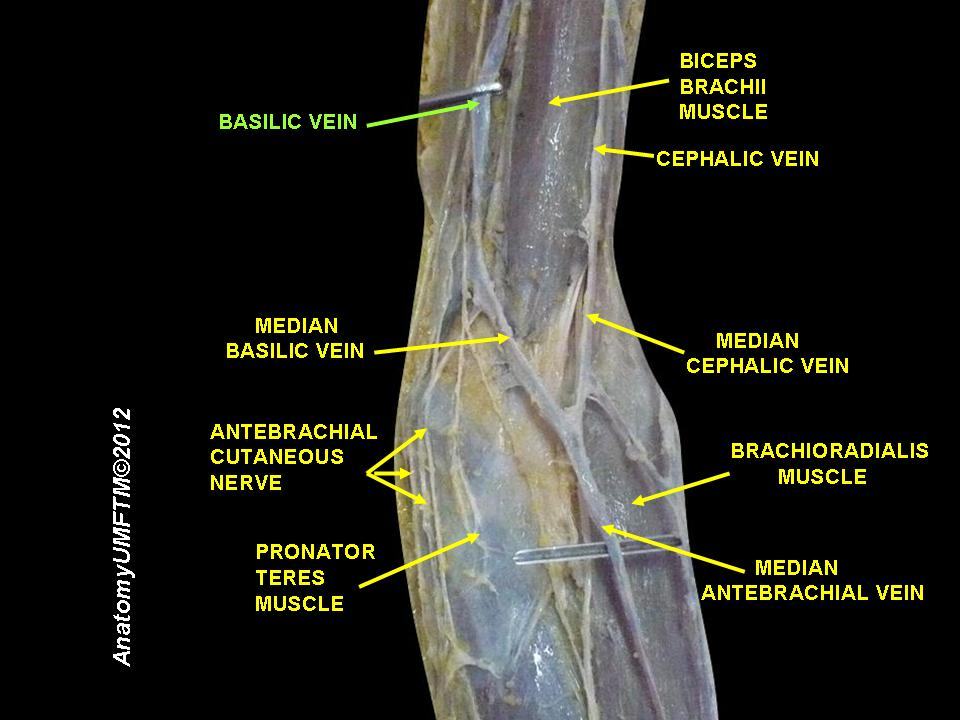
Basilic vein

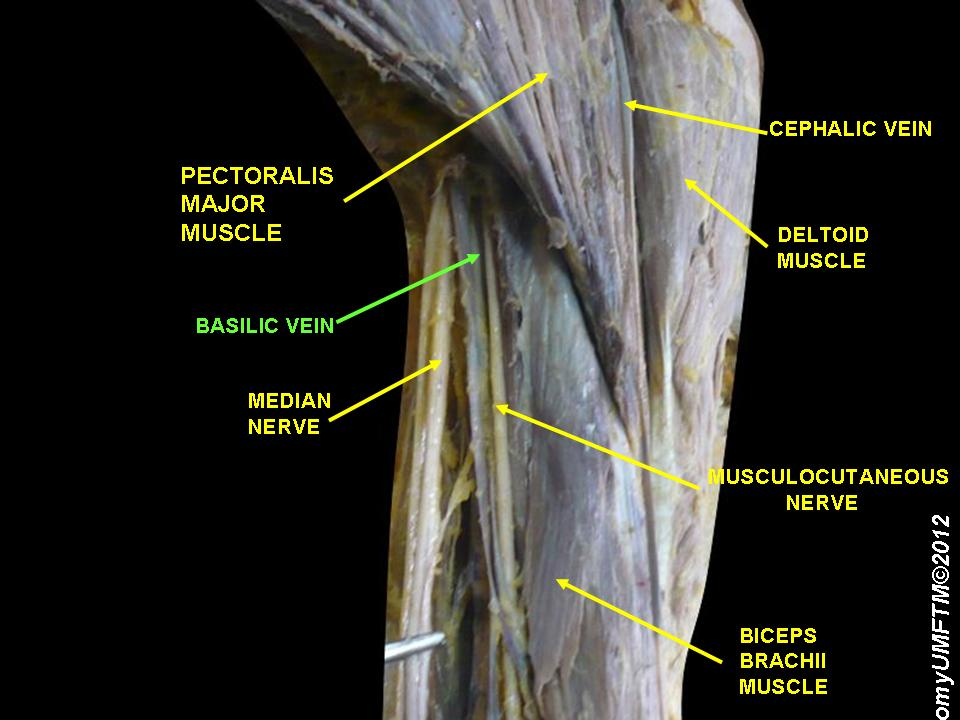
Basilic vein

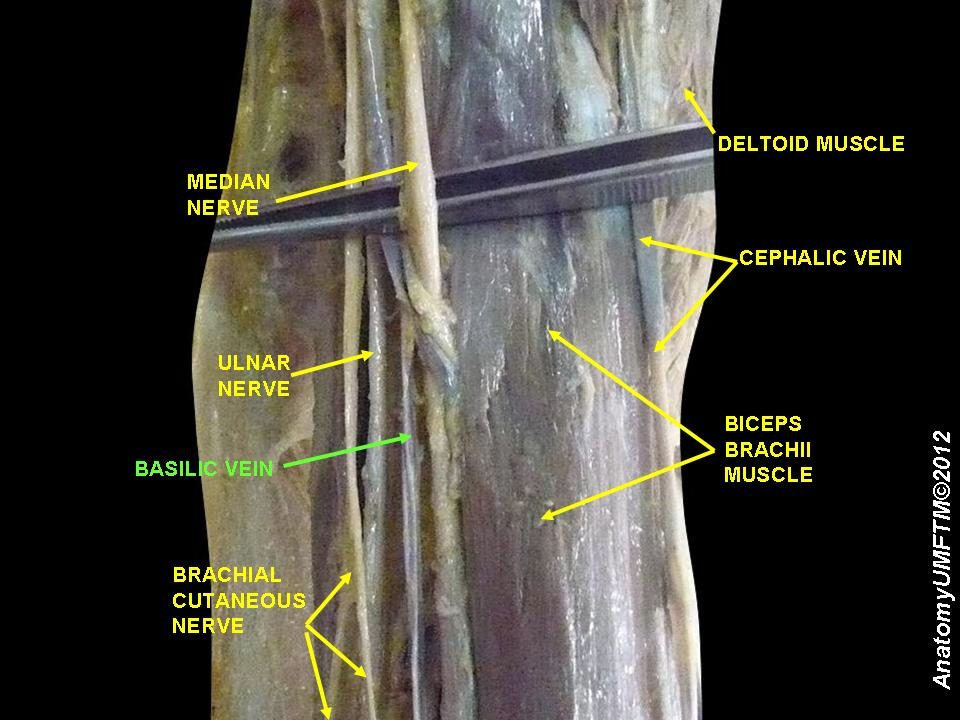
Basilic vein

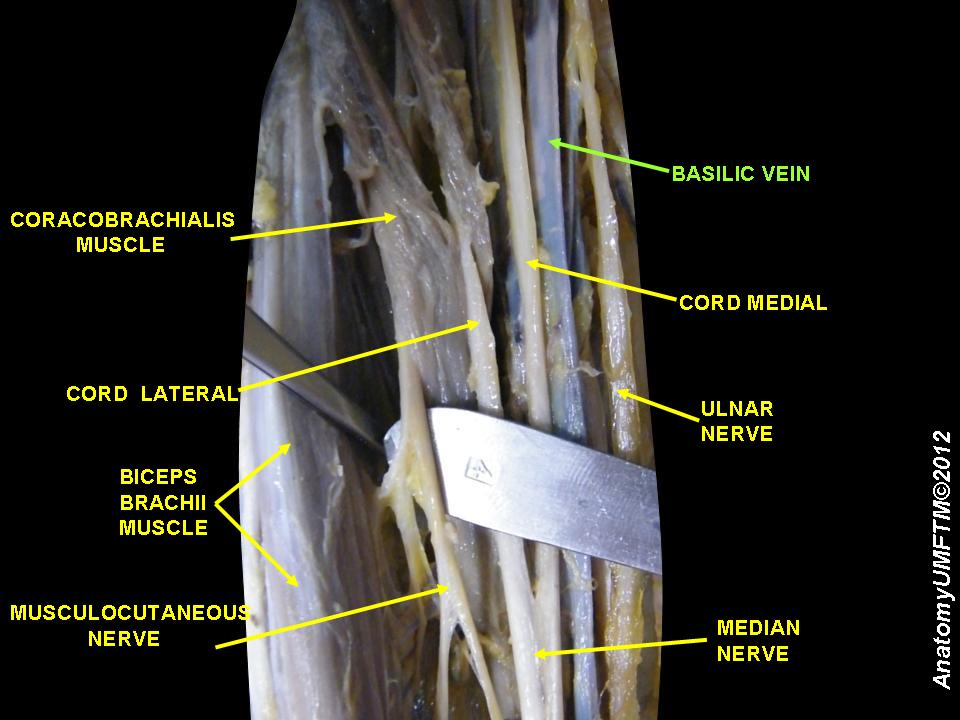
Basilic vein

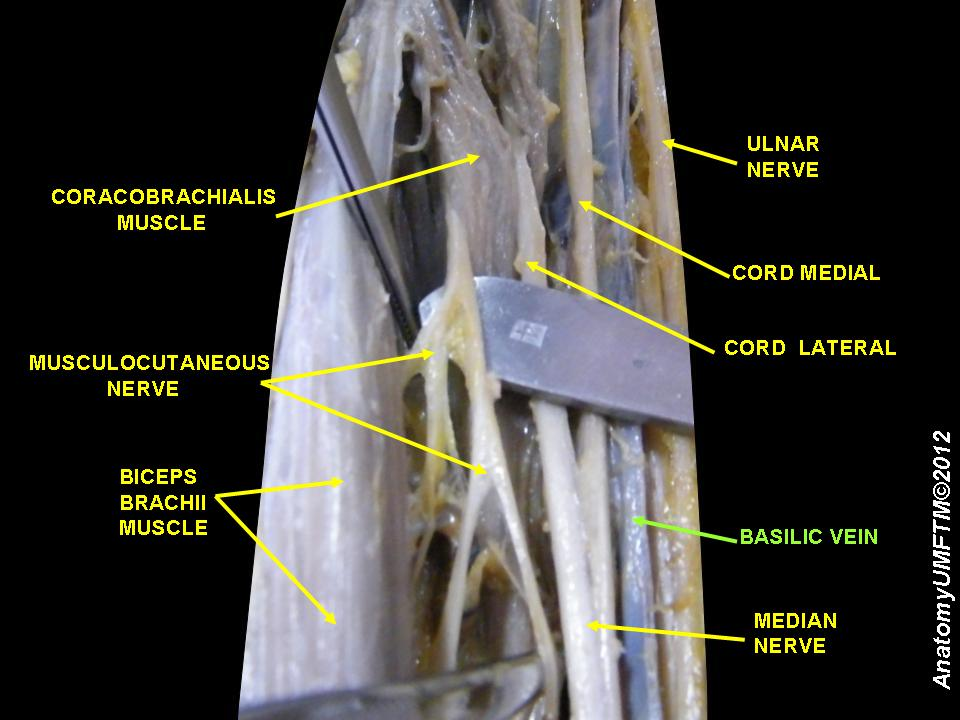
Basilic vein

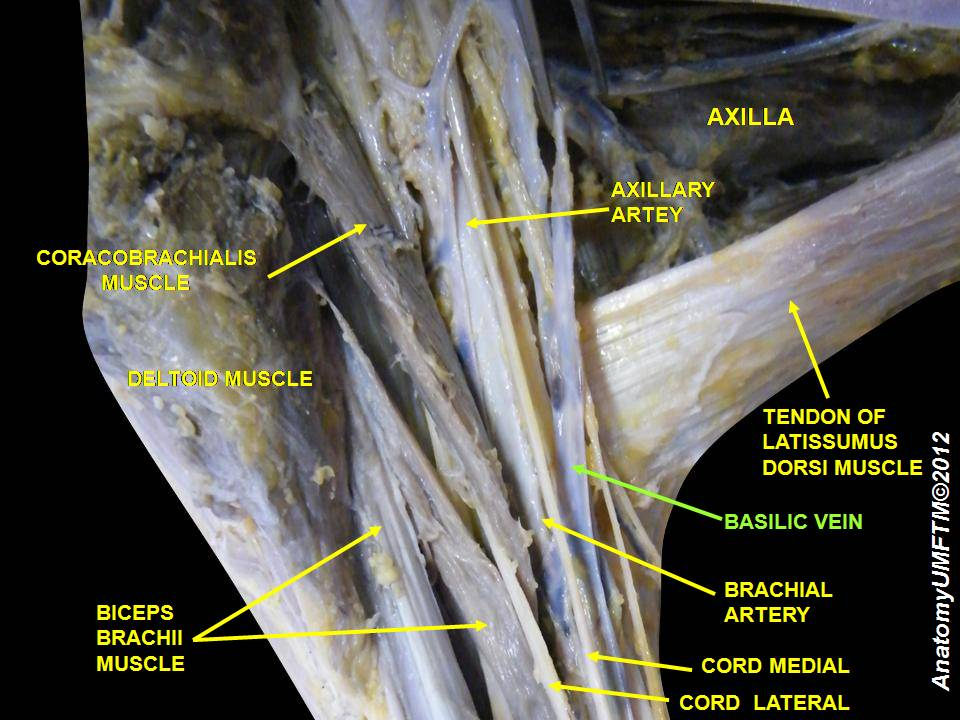
Basilic vein

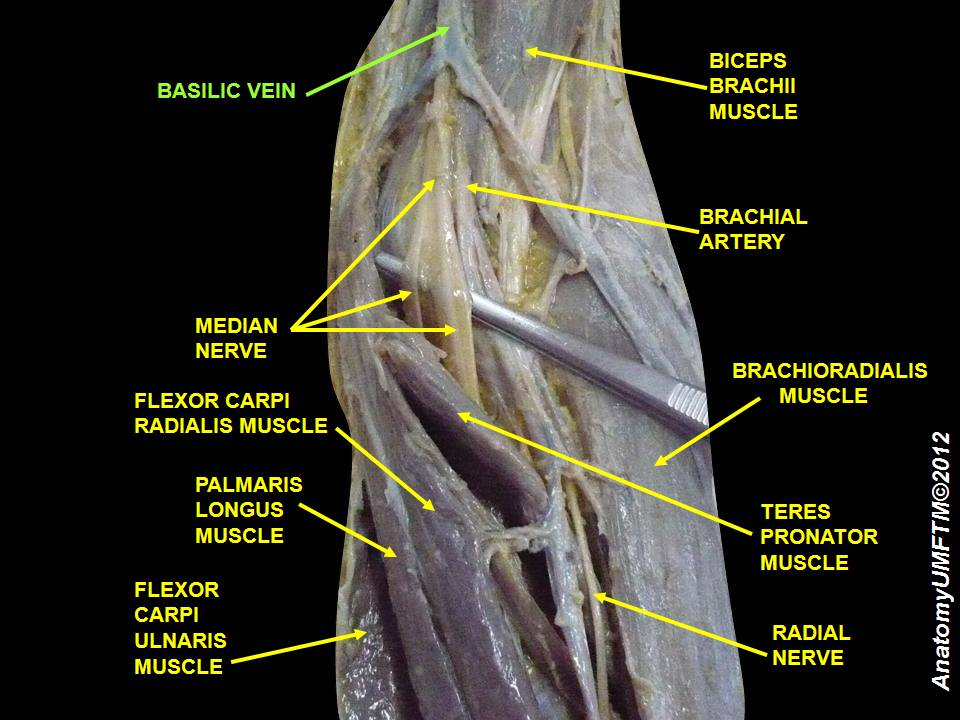
Basilic vein

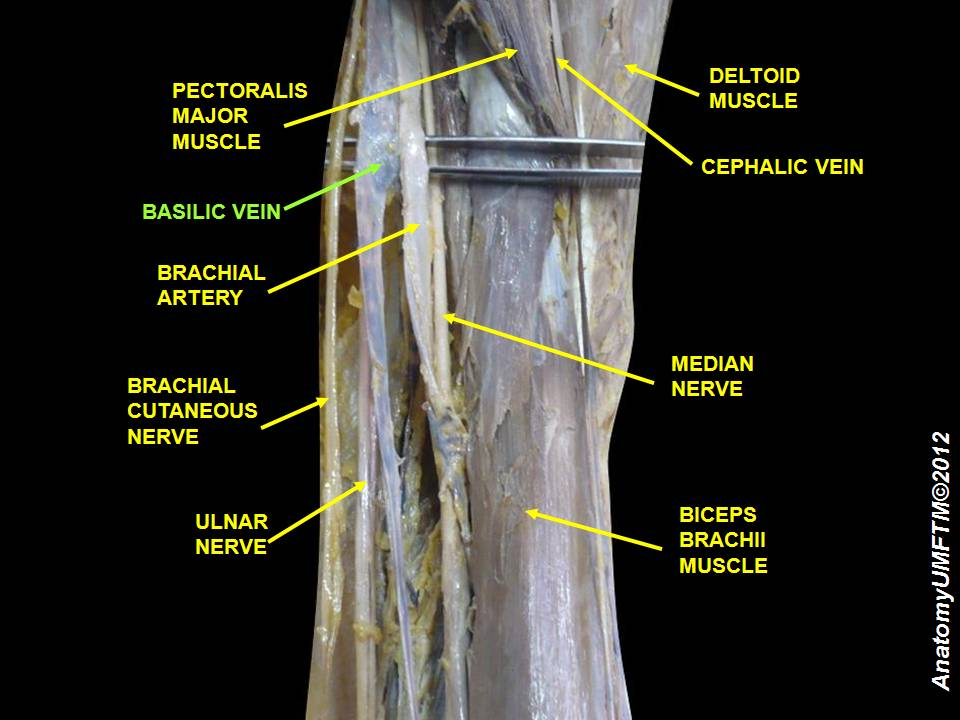
Basilic vein

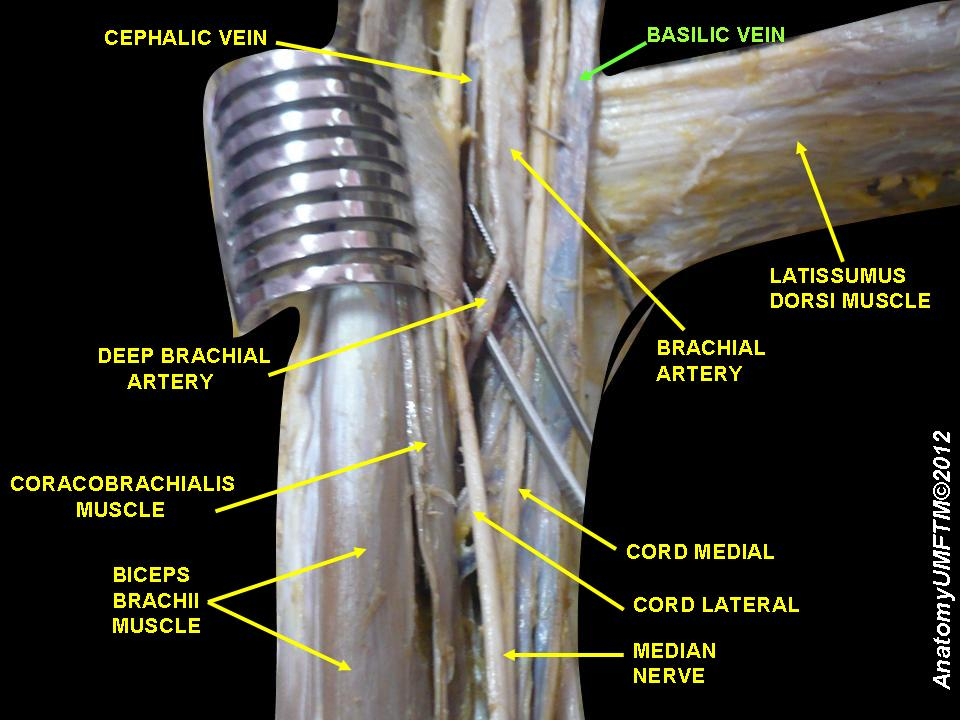
Basilic vein

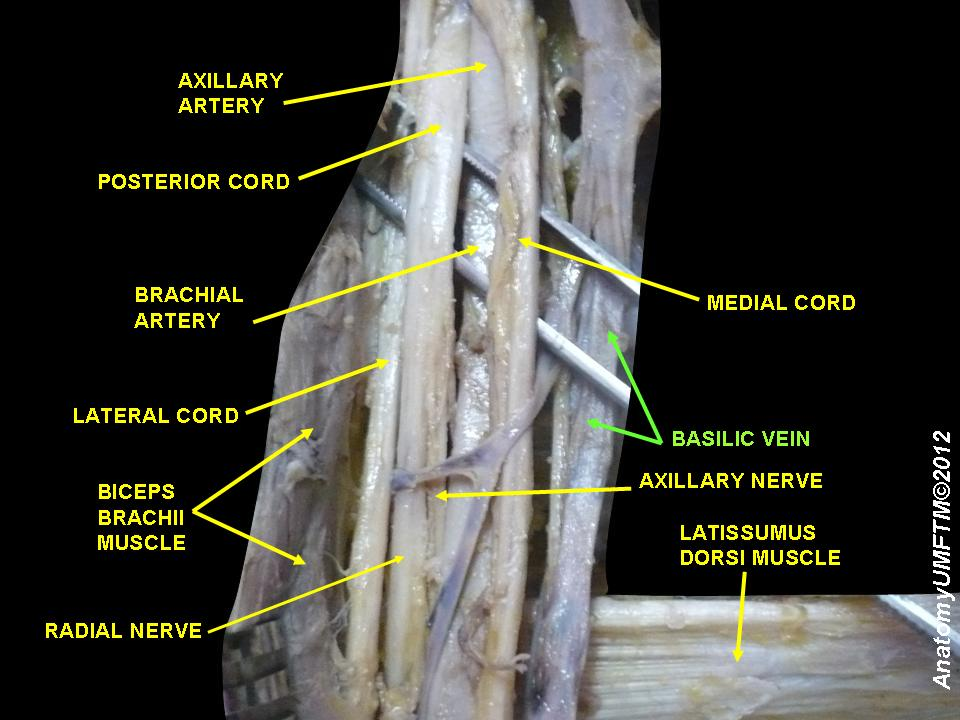
Basilic vein

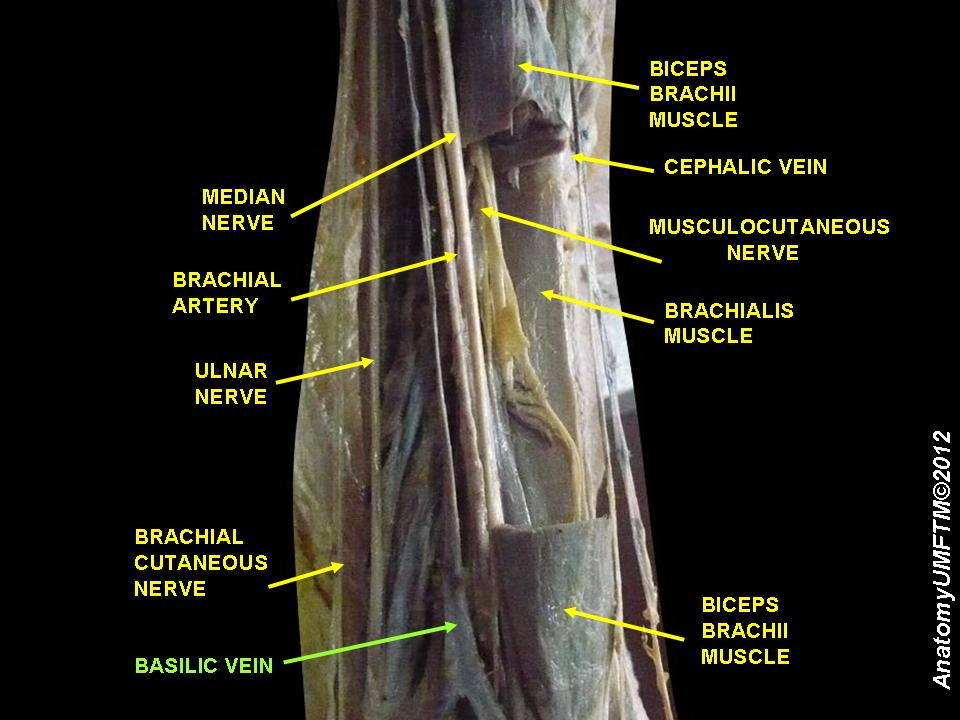
Basilic vein

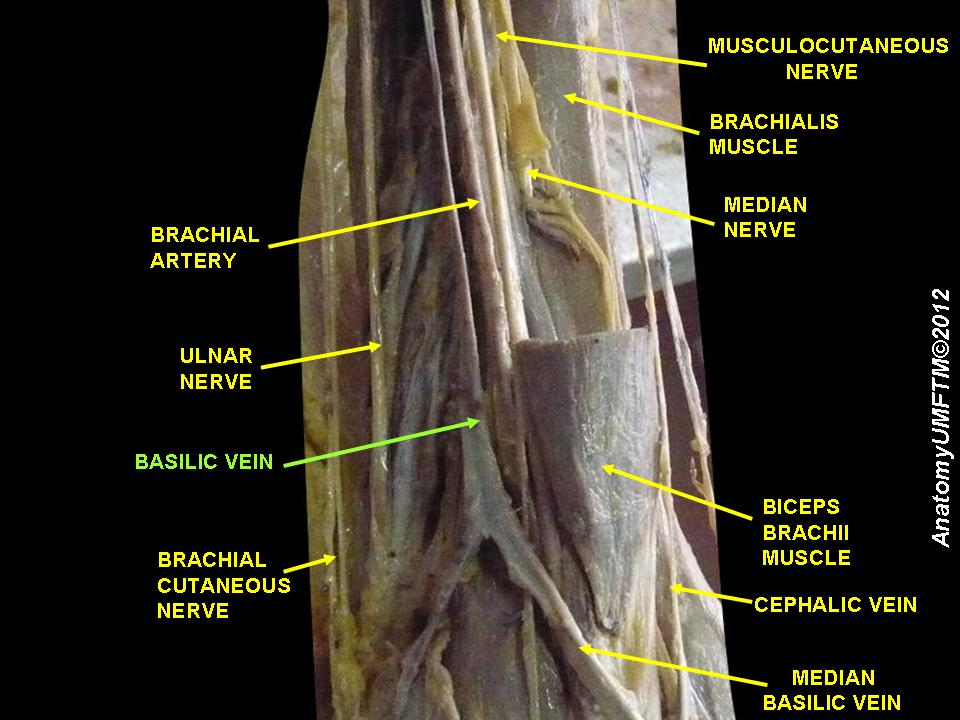
Basilic vein

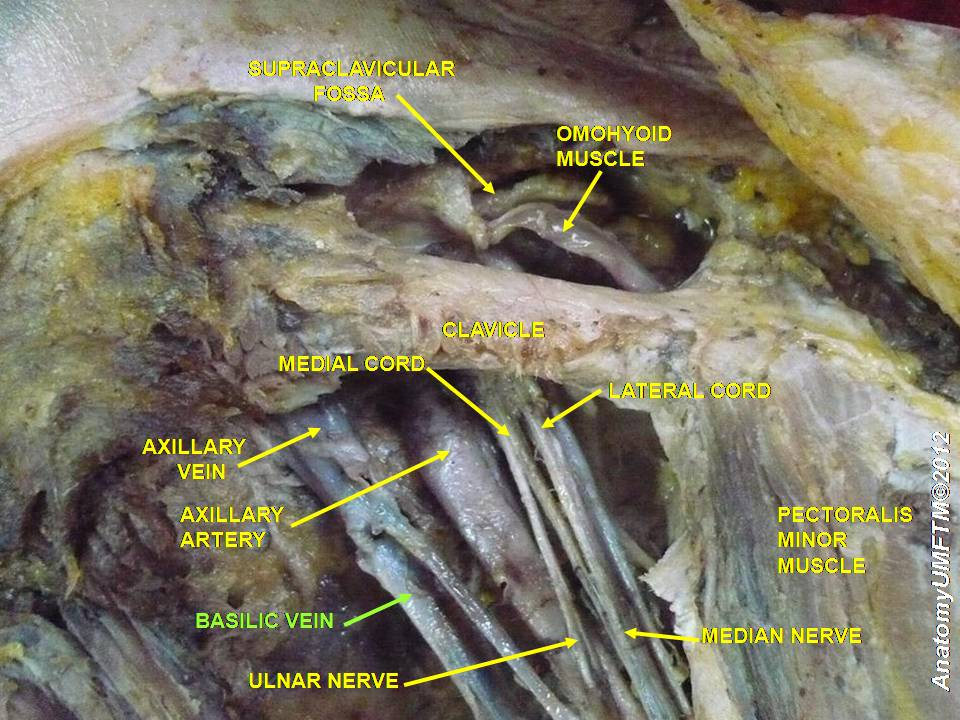
Basilic vein

== See also ==
- Cephalic vein
- Median cubital vein
