= Axillary vein =

Large vein between the thorax and the heart

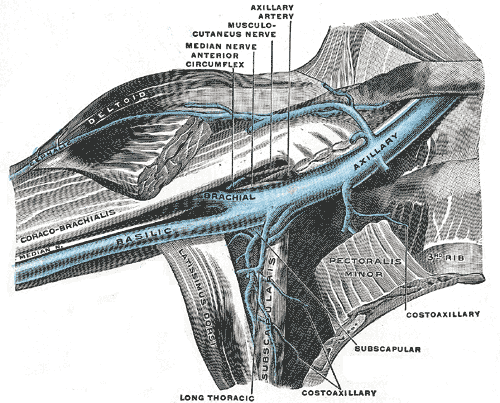
- Anterior view of right upper limb and thorax - axillary vein and the distal part of the basilic vein and cephalic vein.

Details
- Drains from: Axilla
- Source: Basilic vein, brachial veins, cephalic vein
- Drains to: Subclavian vein
- Artery: Axillary artery

Identifiers
- Latin: vena axillaris
- MeSH: D001367
- TA98: A12.3.08.005
- TA2: 4963
- FMA: 13329

In human anatomy, the axillary vein is a large blood vessel that conveys blood from the lateral aspect of the thorax, axilla (armpit) and upper limb toward the heart. There is one axillary vein on each side of the body.

== Structure ==
Its origin is at the lower margin of the teres major muscle and a continuation of the brachial vein.

This large vein is formed by the brachial vein and the basilic vein. At its terminal part, it is also joined by the cephalic vein. Other tributaries include the subscapular vein, circumflex humeral vein, lateral thoracic vein and thoraco-acromial vein. It terminates at the lateral margin of the first rib, at which it becomes the subclavian vein.

It is accompanied along its course by a similarly named artery, the axillary artery, which lies laterally to the axillary vein.

== Additional images ==
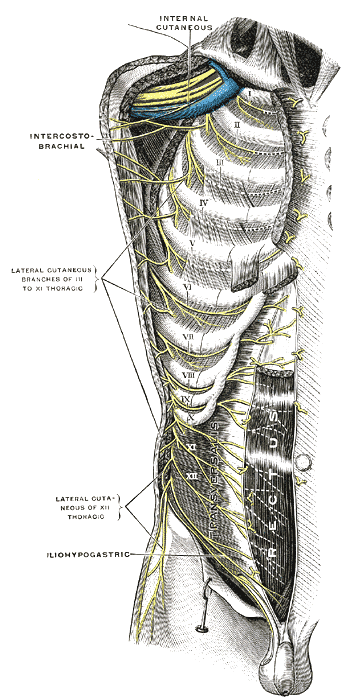
Intercostal nerves, the superficial muscles having been removed.

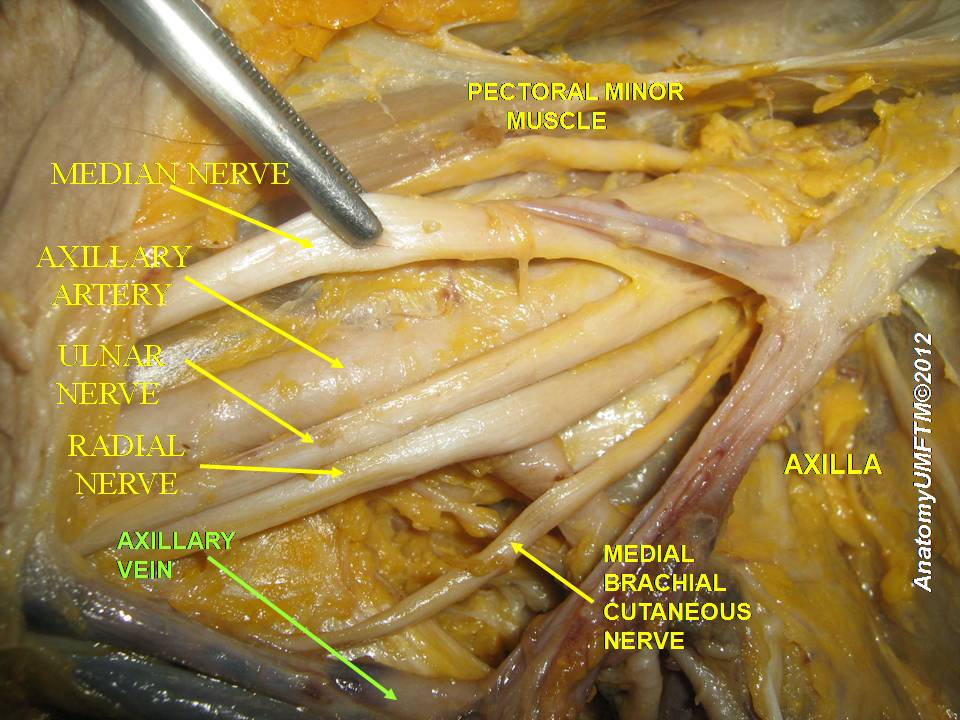
Axillary vein

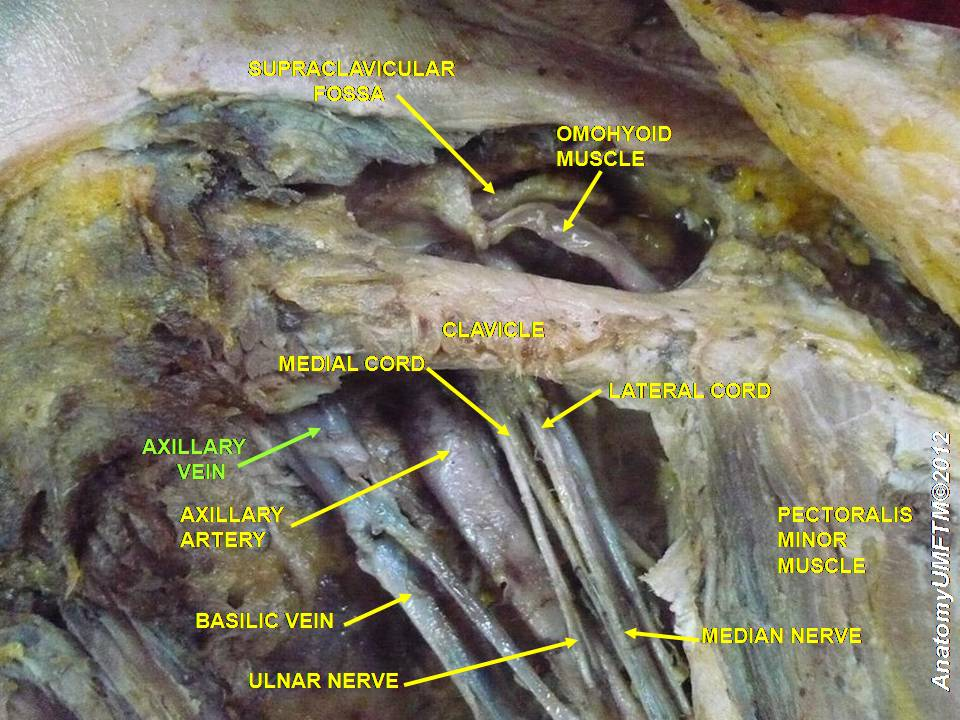
Axillary vein
