= Deltopectoral groove =

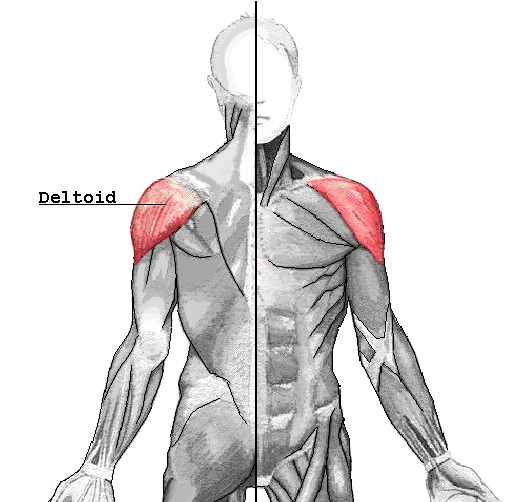
- Deltoid muscle

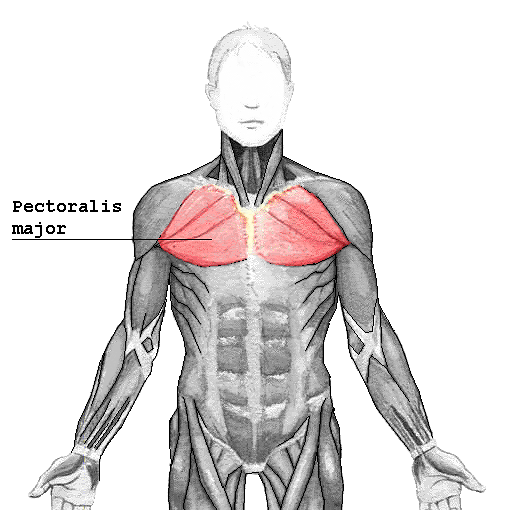
- Pectoralis major
- TA2: 250

The deltopectoral groove is an indentation in the muscular structure between the deltoid muscle and pectoralis major.

It is the location through which the cephalic vein passes and where the coracoid process is most easily palpable.

== See also ==
- Deltopectoral triangle

== Additional images ==
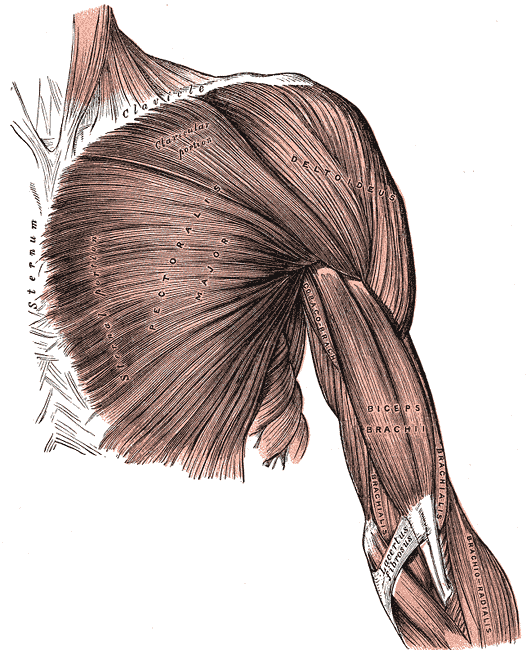
Superficial muscles of the chest and front of the arm.

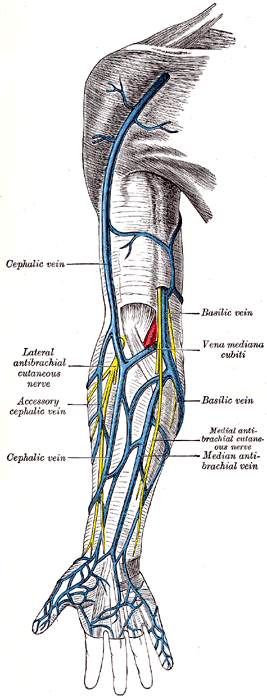
Superficial veins of the upper limb
