= Bicipital aponeurosis =

Distal end of the biceps muscle

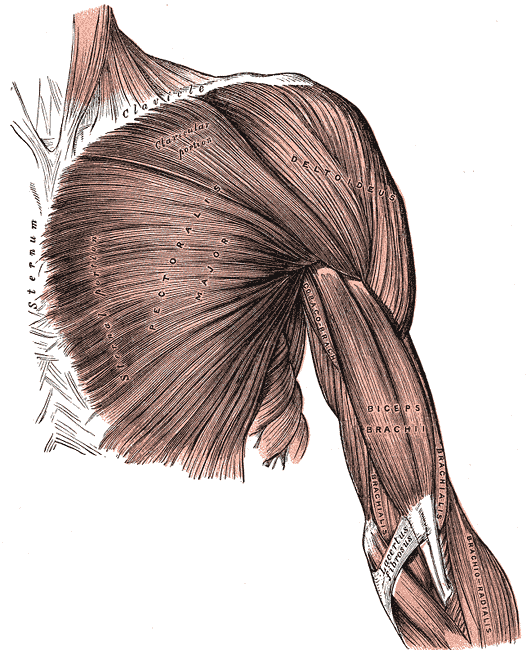
- Superficial muscles of the chest and front of the left arm. (Lacertus fibrosus visible as white band at lower right.)

Details

Identifiers
- Latin: aponeurosis musculi bicipitis brachii
- TA98: A04.6.02.016
- TA2: 2467
- FMA: 39085

The bicipital aponeurosis (also known as lacertus fibrosus or Pirogoff's aponeurosis) is a broad aponeurosis of the biceps brachii, which is located in the cubital fossa of the elbow. It separates superficial from deep structures in much of the fossa.

== Structure ==
The bicipital aponeurosis originates from the distal insertion of the biceps brachii, and inserts into the deep fascia of the forearm. The biceps tendon inserts on the radial tuberosity, and the bicipital aponeurosis lies medially to it. It reinforces the cubital fossa, helping to protect the brachial artery and the median nerve running underneath.

=== Variations ===
Some individuals (about 3% of the population) have a superficial ulnar artery that runs superficially to the bicipital aponeurosis instead of underneath it. These individuals are at risk for accidental injury to the ulnar artery during venipuncture.

== Clinical significance ==
The bicipital aponeurosis is superficial to the brachial artery and the median nerve, but deep to the median cubital vein. This protection is important during venipuncture (taking blood).

It is one structure that has to be incised during fasciotomy in the treatment of acute compartment syndrome of the forearm and elbow region.
