= Median cubital vein =

Superficial vein of the upper limb

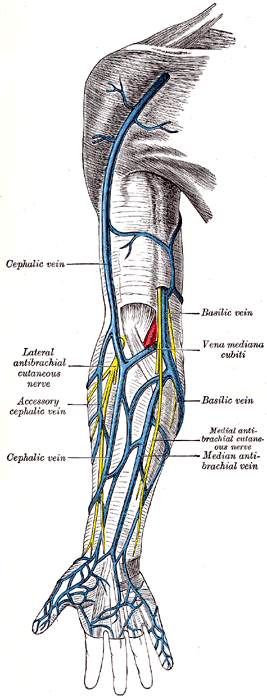
- Superficial veins of the arm. The median cubital vein is labelled (in Latin) - Vena mediana cubiti.

Details
- Source: Cephalic vein
- Drains to: Basilic vein

Identifiers
- Latin: v. mediana cubiti, v. intermedia cubiti
- TA98: A12.3.08.019
- TA2: 4980
- FMA: 22963

In human anatomy, the median cubital vein (or median basilic vein) is a superficial vein of the arm on the anterior aspect of the elbow. It classically shunts blood from the cephalic to the basilic vein at the roof of the cubital fossa. It is typically the most prominent superficial vein in the human body, and is visible when all other veins are hidden by fat or collapsed during a shock.

It arises from the cephalic vein 2.5 cm (one inch) below the lateral epicondyle of the humerus, runs obliquely upward and medially, and empties into the basilic vein 2.5 cm (one inch) above the medial epicondyle.

== Structure ==
The median cubital vein is a superficial vein of the arm. It lies on the anterior aspect of the elbow, in the cubital fossa superficial to the bicipital aponeurosis. It bridges the cephalic vein and the basilic vein.

The median cubital vein receives a number of tributaries from the anterior forearm. The median antebrachial vein may or may not drain into the median cubital vein.

The median cubital vein issues a branch - the perforating vein of the elbow - which pierces the fascial roof of the cubital fossa to join the paired brachial veins.

=== Variations ===
The arrangement of the basilic, cephalic, median cubital, and median antebrachial veins exhibits a wide range of variations. In typical anatomy, the median cubital vein bridges the cephalic and basilic veins across the midline to form a H-pattern. However, in variant anatomy, the median cubial vein is absent, instead replaced by a dominant median antebrachial vein that splits into intermediate cephalic and basilic veins to drain in the cephalic and basilic veins, respectively, forming a M-pattern. Several other alternative patterns exist, including ones where no anastomosis occurs between the basilic and cephalic veins, and ones where the median cubital vein is doubled. When the median cubital vein is large, it transfers most or all blood from the cephalic vein to the basilic vein, so that the cephalic vein is either significantly diminished or altogether absent.

== Clinical significance ==
The median cubital vein is routinely used for phlebotomy and venipuncture (taking blood), and as a site for an intravenous cannula. This is due to its particularly wide lumen, and its tendency to remain stationary upon needle insertion. It becomes prominent when pressure is applied downstream, which makes needle insertion easier. Such pressure is created using a tourniquet.

== Additional images ==
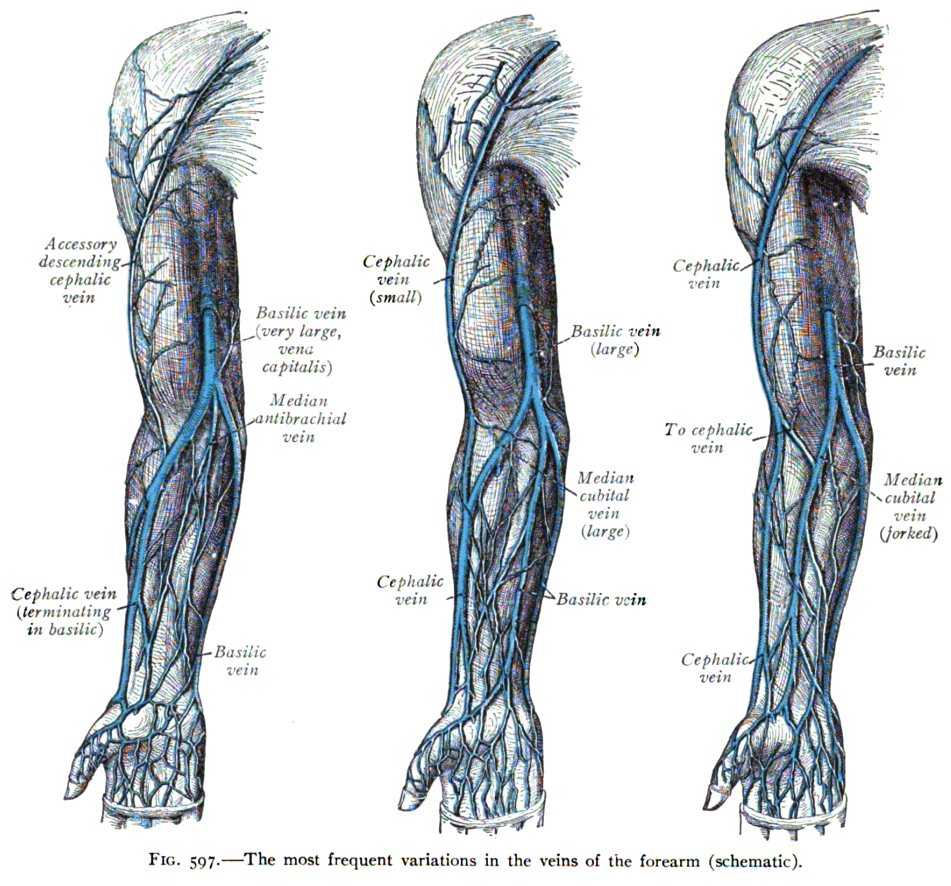
The most frequent variations of the veins of the forearm (schematic).

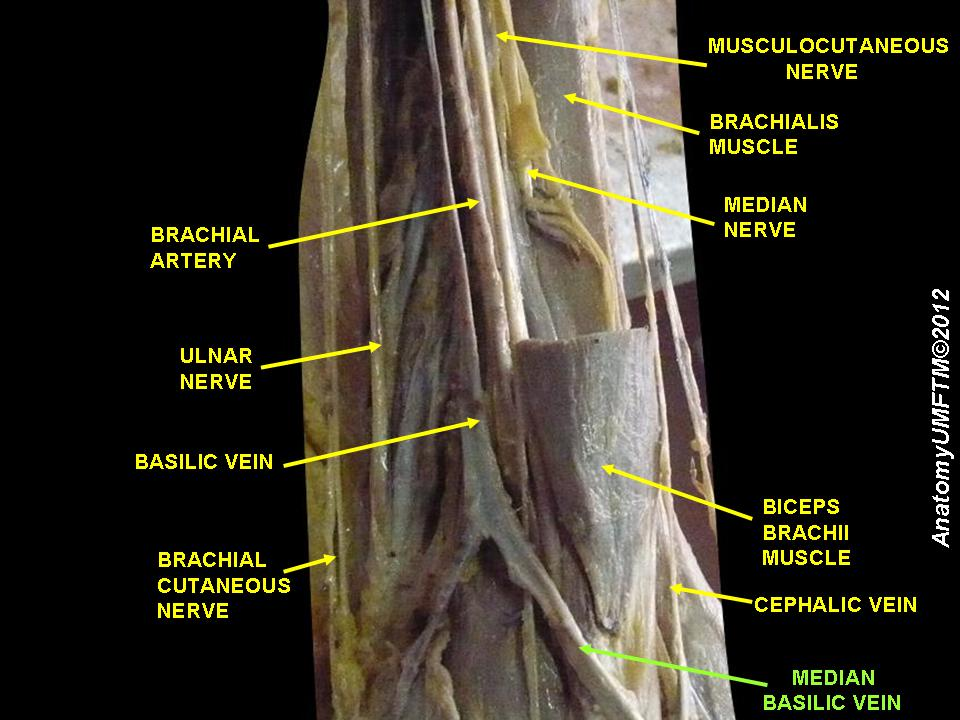
The median cubital vein, labelled as the median basilic vein. Left upper limb.

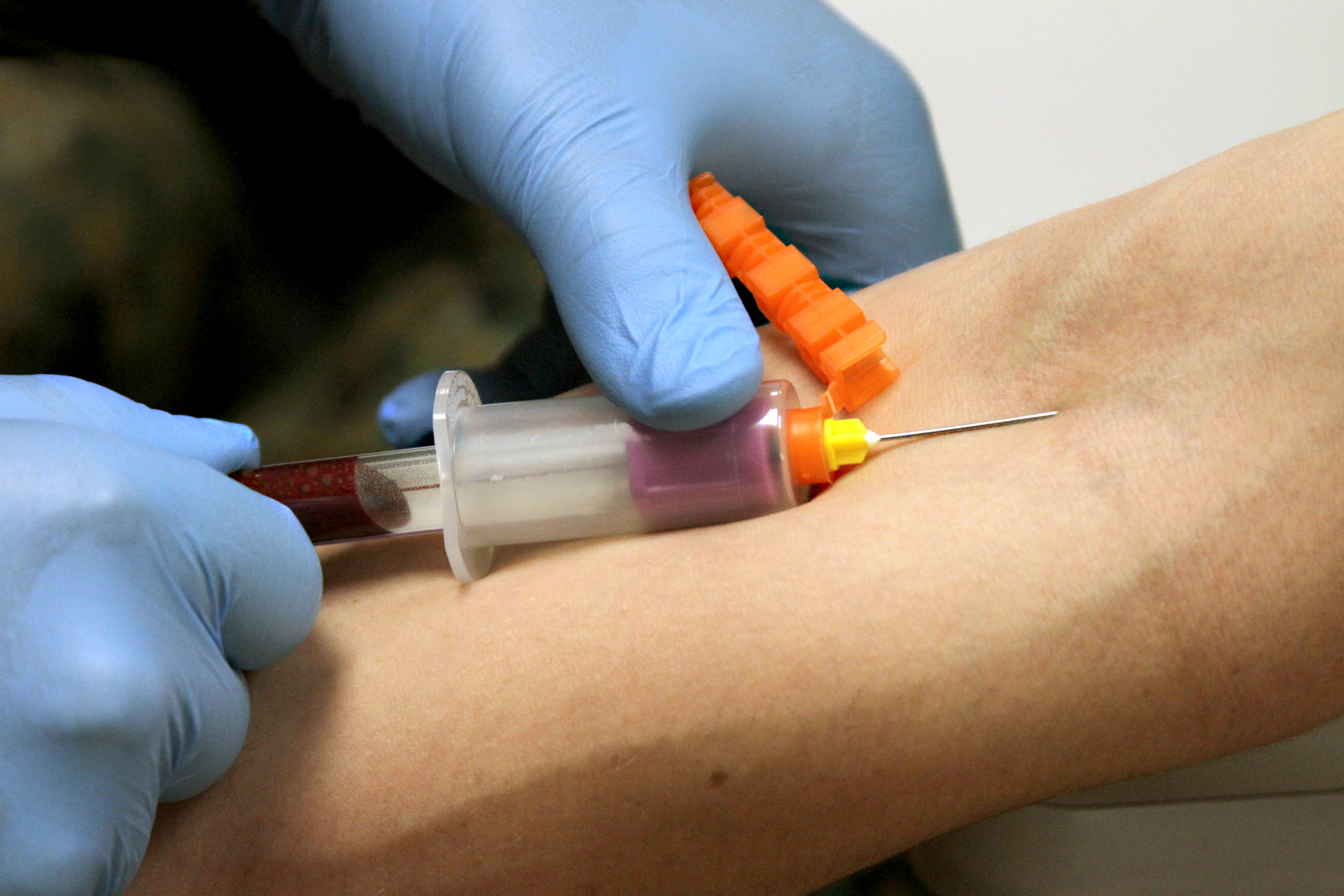
A vacutainer being used to draw blood from the median cubital vein for a blood test.

== See also ==
- Basilic vein
- Cephalic vein
