= Cephalic vein =

Large blood vessel in the arm

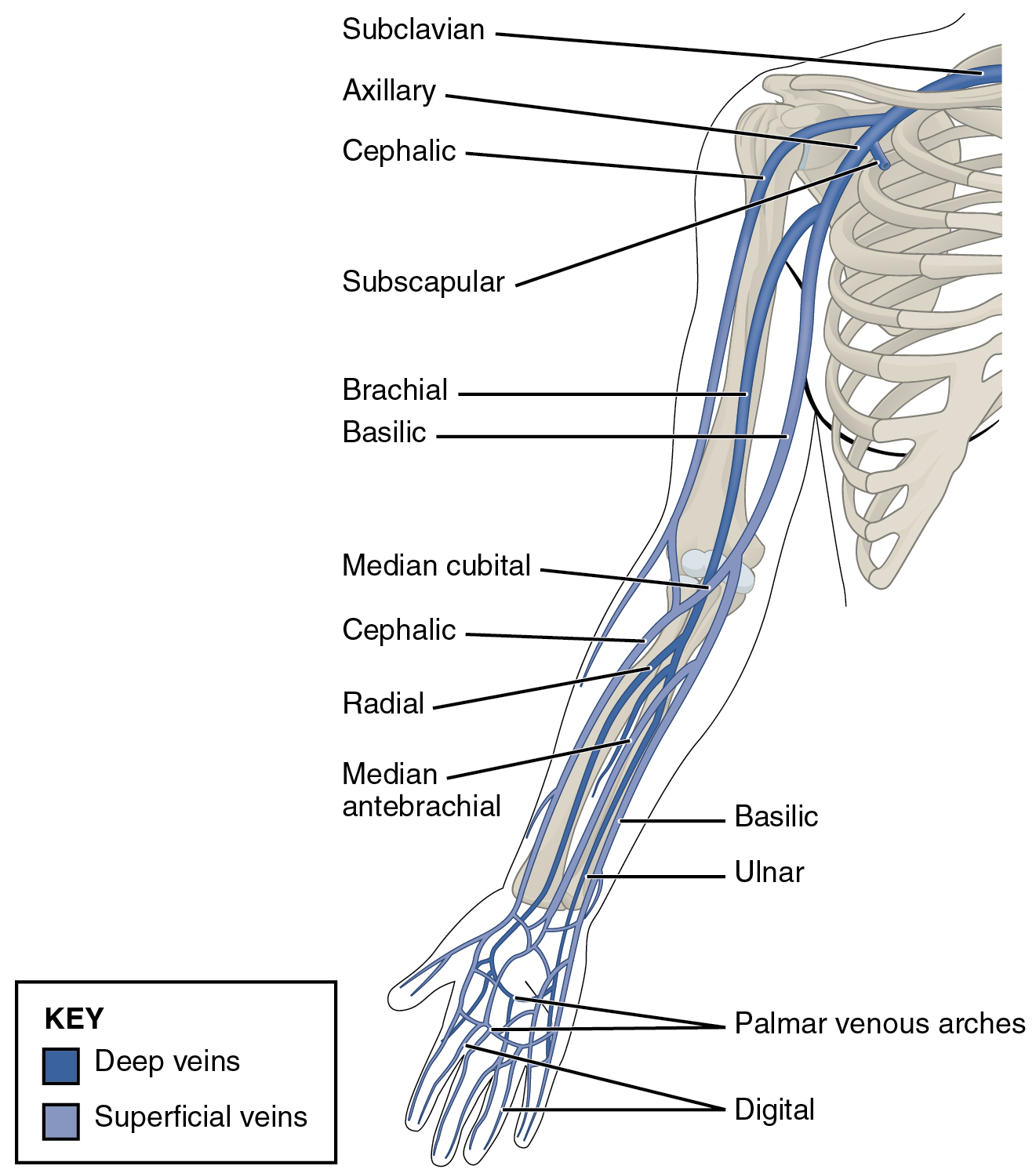
- Veins of the upper limb

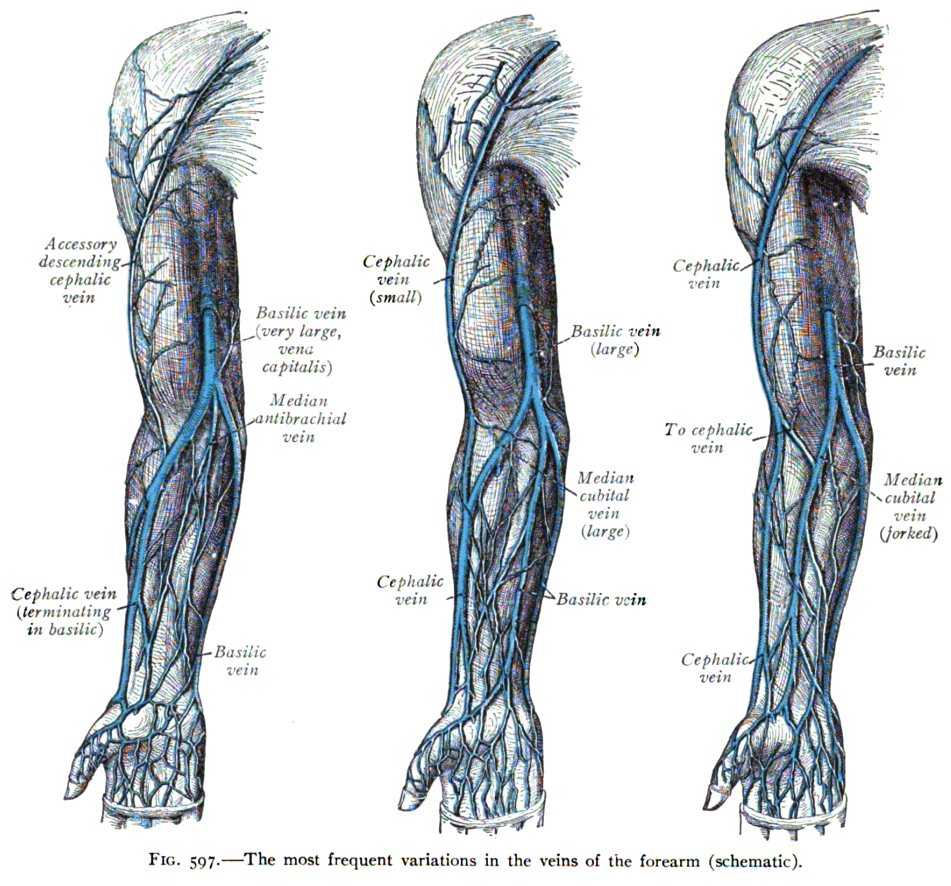
- The most frequent variations of the veins of the forearm

Details
- Drains from: Dorsal venous network of hand
- Drains to: Axillary vein and median cubital vein
- Artery: Deltoid branch of thoracoacromial artery

Identifiers
- Latin: vena cephalica
- TA98: A12.3.08.015
- TA2: 4964
- FMA: 13324

In human anatomy, the cephalic vein is a superficial vein in the arm. It is the longest vein of the upper limb. It starts at the anatomical snuffbox from the radial end of the dorsal venous network of hand, and ascends along the radial (lateral) side of the arm before emptying into the axillary vein. At the elbow, it communicates with the basilic vein via the median cubital vein. It is provided with 13 pairs of valves, of which five occur in its antebrachial portion, seven in its brachial portion, and one at its union with the axillary vein.

== Anatomy ==
The cephalic vein is situated within the superficial fascia along the anterolateral surface of the biceps.

=== Origin ===
The cephalic vein forms at the roof of the anatomical snuffbox at the radial end of the dorsal venous network of hand.

=== Course and relations ===
From its origin, it ascends up the lateral aspect of the radius.

Near the shoulder, the cephalic vein passes between the deltoid and pectoralis major muscles (deltopectoral groove) through the clavipectoral triangle, where it empties into the axillary vein.

=== Anastomoses ===
It communicates with the basilic vein via the median cubital vein at the elbow.

== Clinical significance ==
The cephalic vein is often visible through the skin, and its location in the deltopectoral groove is fairly consistent, making this site a good candidate for venous access. Permanent pacemaker leads are often placed in the cephalic vein in the deltopectoral groove. The vein may be used for intravenous access, as large bore cannula may be easily placed. However, the cannulation of a vein as close to the radial nerve as the cephalic vein can sometimes lead to nerve damage.

== History ==
Ordinarily the term cephalic refers to anatomy of the head, from the Greek term for the head, kephale. When the Persian Muslim physician Ibn Sīnā's Canon was translated into medieval Latin, the Arabic term al-kífal 'outer' was mistakenly translated as cephalic.

== Additional images ==
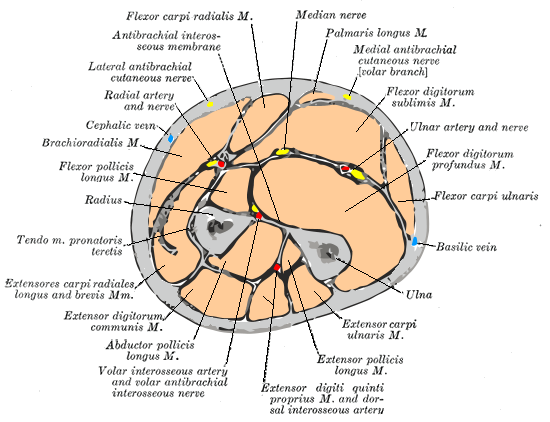
Cross-section through the middle of the forearm

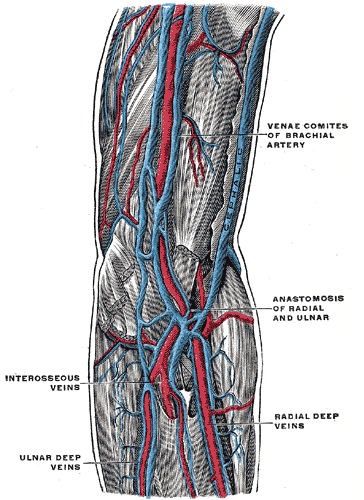
The deep veins of the upper extremity

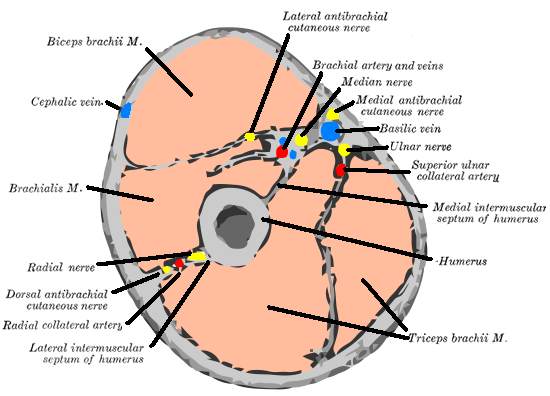
Cross-section through the middle of upper arm
(cephalic vein labeled at upper left)

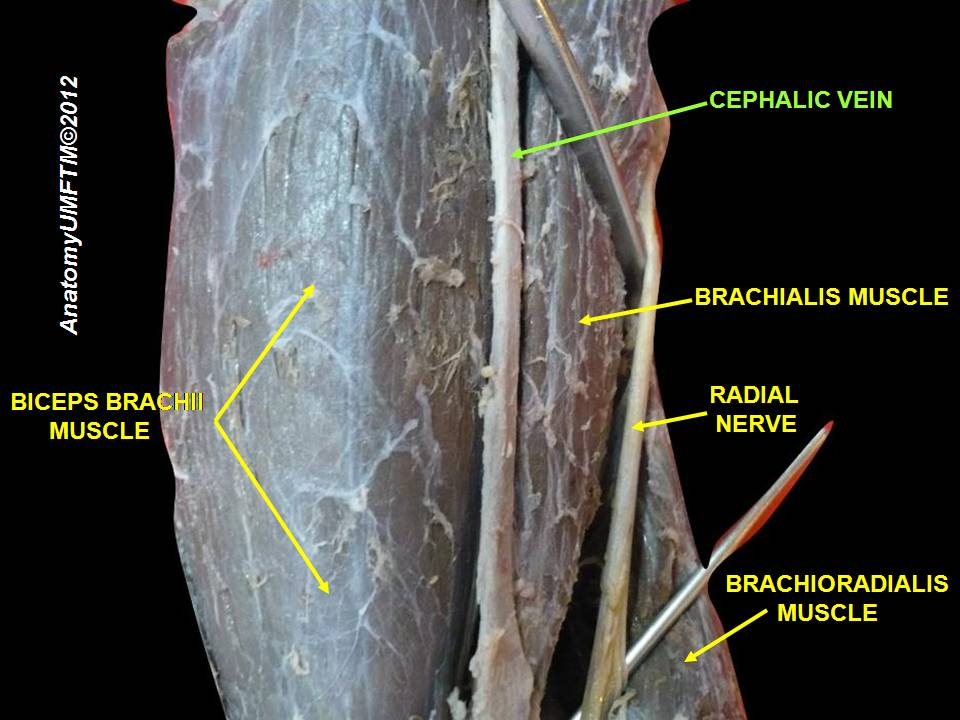
Cephalic vein

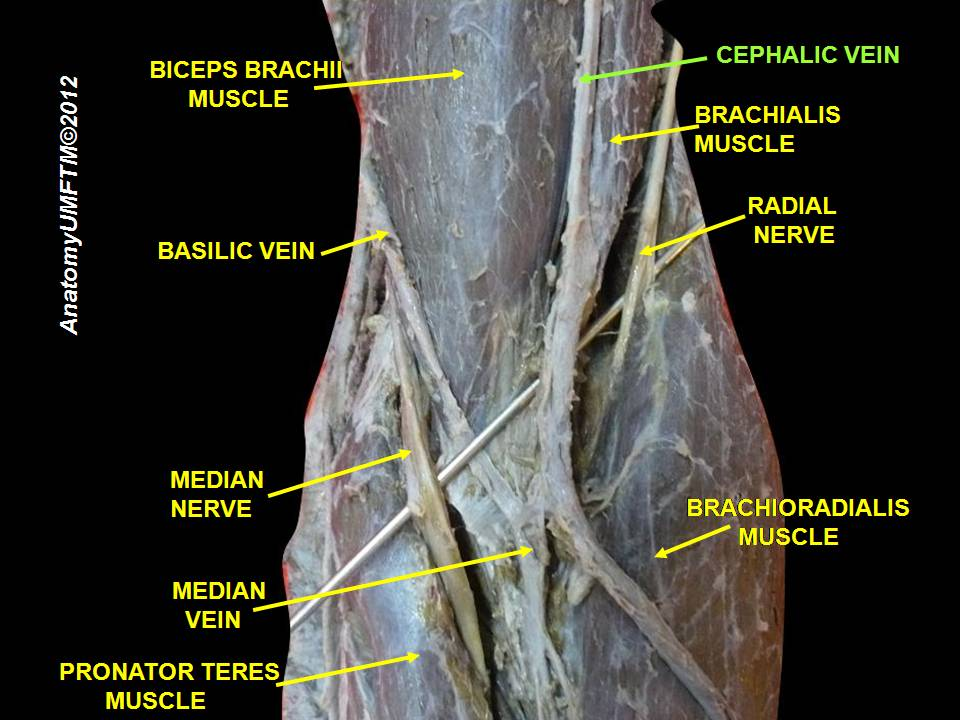
Cephalic vein

== See also ==
- Basilic vein
- Cimino fistula
- Median cubital vein
