= Superficial vein =

Veins close to the surface of the body

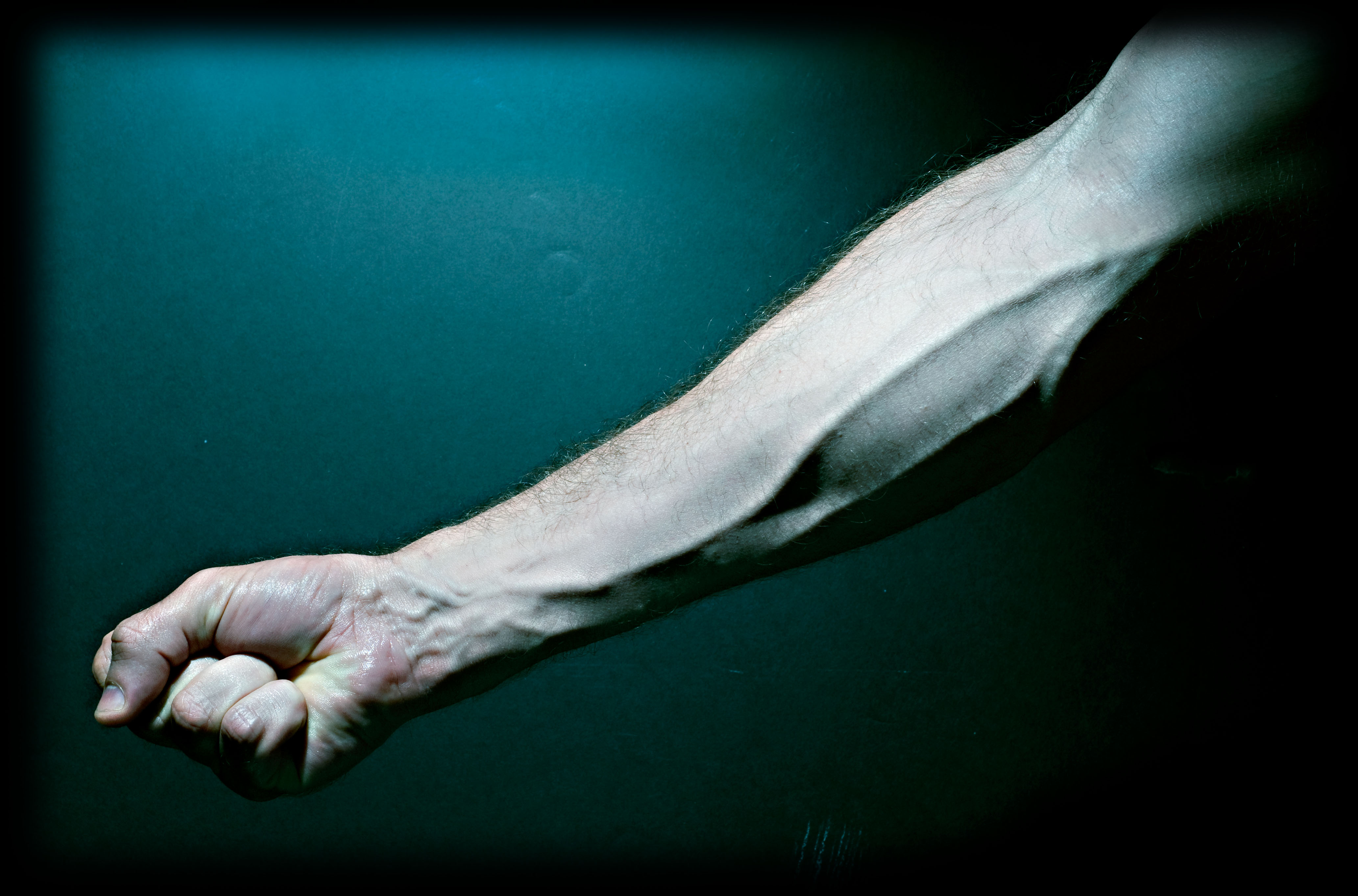
- Superficial veins become more prominent when muscles are flexed

Details

Identifiers
- Latin: vena superficialis
- TA98: A12.0.00.036
- TA2: 3910
- FMA: 76719

Superficial veins are veins that are close to the surface of the body, as opposed to deep veins, which are far from the surface.

Superficial veins are not paired with an artery, unlike the deep veins, which are typically associated with an artery of the same name.

Superficial veins are important physiologically for cooling of the body. When the body is too hot, the body shunts blood from the deep veins to the superficial veins to facilitate heat transfer to the body's surroundings. Superficial veins are often visible underneath the skin. Those below the level of the heart tend to bulge out, which can be readily witnessed in the hand, where the veins bulge significantly less after the arm has been raised above the head for a short time. Veins become more visually prominent when lifting heavy weight, especially after a period of proper strength training.

Physiologically, the superficial veins are not as important as the deep veins (as they carry less blood) and are sometimes removed in a procedure called vein stripping, which is used to treat varicose veins.

== Some named superficial veins ==
- External jugular vein

=== Upper limb ===
- Cephalic vein – glides along the biceps: the "signature vein" of bodybuilders
- Median cubital vein – often used to draw blood (venipuncture).
- Basilic vein – usually the largest vein in the arm: often used for dialysis access

=== Lower limb ===
- Small saphenous vein
- Great saphenous vein – often "harvested" for coronary artery bypass surgery

== See also ==
- Deep veins
- Varicose veins
- Vascularity
