= Collateral ligaments of interphalangeal joints =

Collateral ligaments of interphalangeal joints are associated with the interphalangeal joints of both the hands and feet:

- Collateral ligament of interphalangeal joints of hand
- Collateral ligaments of interphalangeal joints of foot
