= Axillary joints =

Joints of the armpit region

- The shoulder joint labelled as glenohumeral joint, and acromioclavicular joint

Details

Identifiers
- Latin: articulatio acromioclavicularis

The axillary joints are two joints in the axillary region of the body, and include the shoulder joint and the acromioclavicular joint.

== Shoulder joint ==
The shoulder joint also known as the glenohumeral joint is a synovial ball and socket joint. The shoulder joint involves articulation between the glenoid cavity of the scapula (shoulder blade) and the head of the upper arm bone (humerus) and functions as a diarthrosis and multiaxial joint.

Due to the very loose joint capsule that gives a limited interface of the humerus and scapula, it is the most mobile joint of the human body.

== Acromioclavicular joint ==
The acromioclavicular joint, is the joint at the top of the shoulder. It is the junction between the acromion (part of the scapula that forms the highest point of the shoulder) and the clavicle. It is a plane synovial joint.

The acromioclavicular joint allows the arm to be raised above the head. This joint functions as a pivot point (although technically it is a gliding synovial joint), acting like a strut to help with movement of the scapula resulting in a greater degree of arm rotation.
