= Phalangeal articulations of foot =

Phalangeal articulations of foot may refer to:

- Metatarsophalangeal articulations
- Interphalangeal articulations of foot
