= Crepitation =

Crepitation refers to situations where noises are produced by the rubbing of parts one against the other, as in:

- Crepitus, a crunching sensation felt in certain medical problems
- Rales or crackles, abnormal sounds heard over the lungs with a stethoscope
- A mechanism of sound production in grasshoppers during flight. Also called "wing snapping".
