= Knuckle =

Finger joints

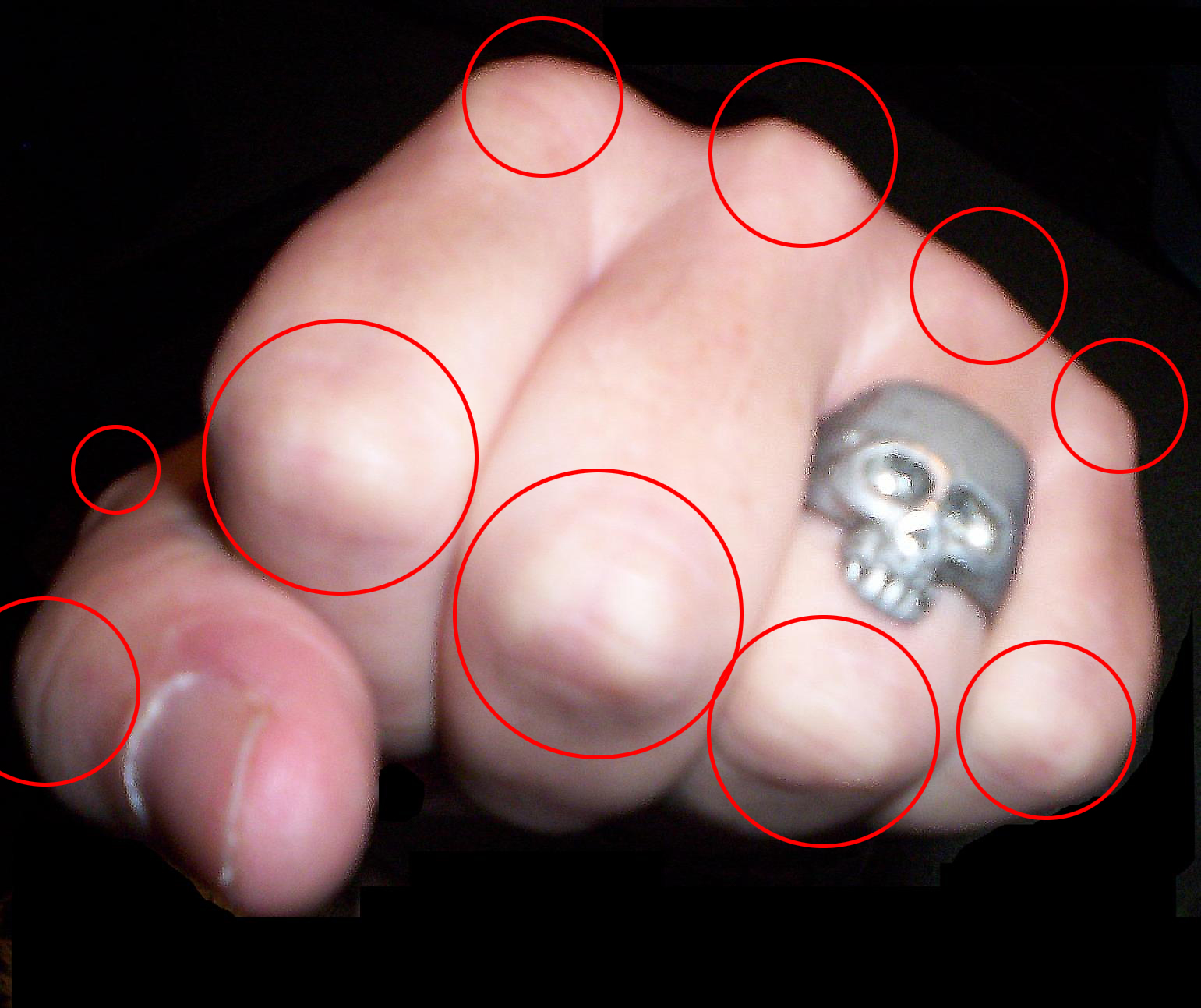
- The major knuckles of the hand (encircled in red)

The knuckles are the joints of the fingers. The word is cognate to similar words in other Germanic languages, such as the Dutch "knokkel" (knuckle) or German "Knöchel" (ankle), i.e., Knöchlein, the diminutive of the German word for bone (Knochen). Anatomically, the knuckles consist of the metacarpophalangeal (MCP) and interphalangeal (IP) joints of the finger. The knuckles at the base of the fingers may be referred to as the 1st or major knuckles while the knuckles at the midfinger are known as the 2nd and 3rd, or minor, knuckles. However, the ordinal terms are used inconsistently and may refer to any of the knuckles.

== Cracking ==
The physical mechanism behind the popping or cracking sound heard when cracking joints such as knuckles was elucidated in 2015 by cine MRI to be caused by tribonucleation as a gas bubble forms in the synovial fluid that bathes the joint. Despite this evidence, many still believe it to be caused by synovial fluid filling the vacuum left by the joint's displacement. In 2009, Donald L Unger was awarded the Ig Nobel for Medicine for his informal experiment with knuckle cracking. For 50 years, he cracked the knuckles of one hand while not cracking the knuckles of the other during that time. He self-reported no issues with arthritis on either hand.

== Gallery ==
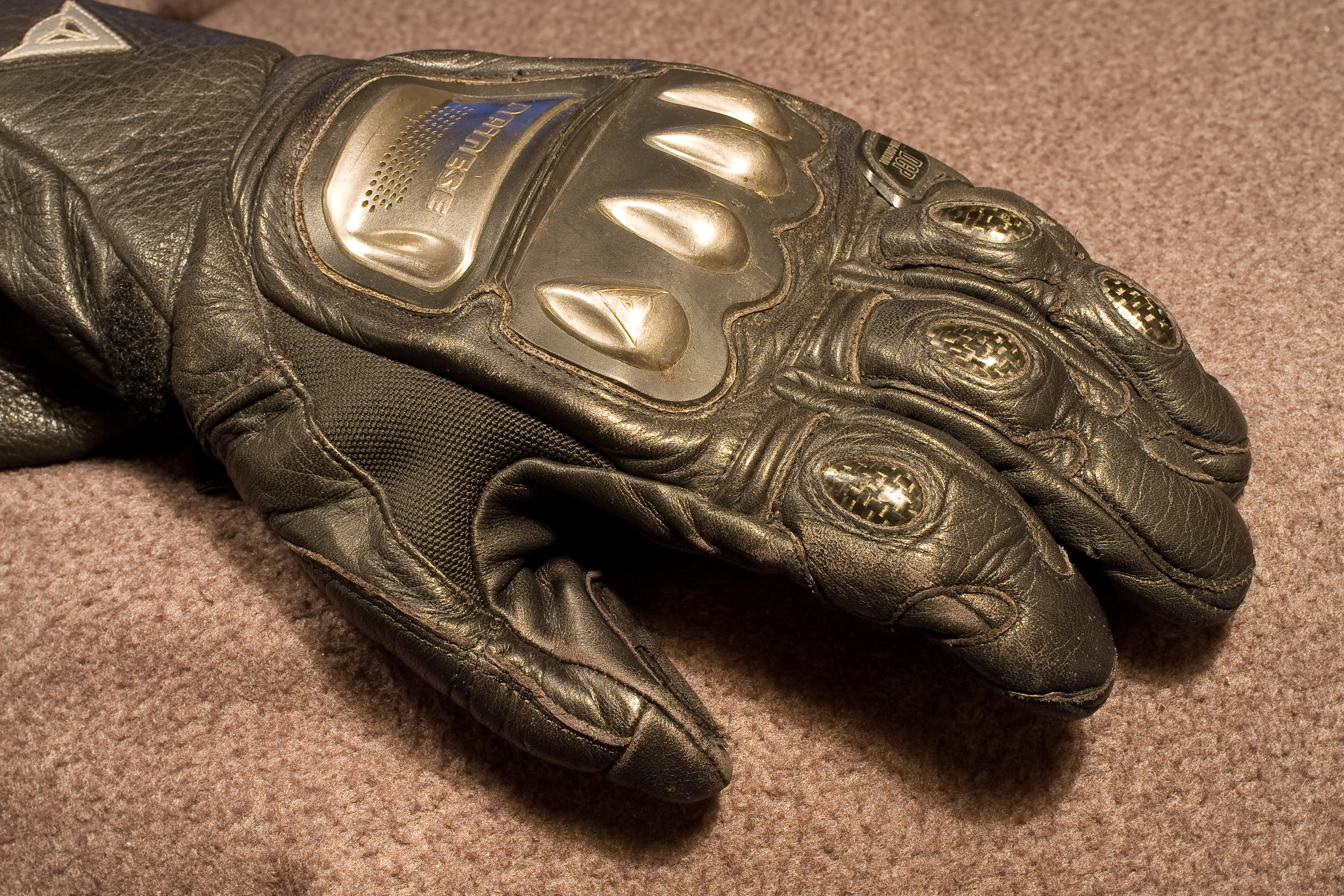
Motorcycle racing gloves with titanium knuckle protectors

== See also ==
- Metatarsophalangeal joints, also informally known as toe knuckles, the equivalent joints in the toes.
- Metacarpophalangeal joint
