= Crepitus =

Grating sound or feeling due to friction between bones or joints

Crepitus (/ˈkrɛpɪtəs/) or crepitation is "a grating sound or sensation produced by friction between bone and cartilage or the fractured parts of a bone".

Various types of crepitus that may be heard in joint pathologies are:

- Bone crepitus: This may be heard when two fragments of a fracture are moved against each other.
- Crepitus of bursitis: This is heard when the fluid in the bursa contains small, loose fibrinous particles.
- Crepitus of tenosynovitis: This may result from inflammation of the fluid-filled sheath (synovium) that surrounds a tendon.

== Causes ==
The crepitus sound may be created when two rough surfaces in an organism's body come into contact—for example, in osteoarthritis or rheumatoid arthritis when the cartilage around joints erodes and the surfaces in the joint grind against one another, or, when the two fractured surfaces of a broken bone rub together. Crepitus is a common sign of bone fracture.

Crepitus at a joint may be created easily and observed by exerting a small amount of force on the joint, thus 'cracking it'. This may be caused by the bursting of bubbles of nitrogen that have formed in the synovial fluid. This phenomenon is caused when the movement of the joint lowers the pressure of its synovial fluid, causing the bubbles to form and burst. A refractory period of approximately 20 minutes exists after a cracking, wherein, until the nitrogen gas dissolves back into the synovial fluid, the joint cannot be stimulated to produce crepitus again. Almost every joint in the body may be 'cracked' in this way, but the joints that require the least force to produce this effect include the hallux (big toes), the knuckles, and the neck joints. Joint crepitus also may be observed when a joint is moved passively with one hand, while the other hand is placed on the joint to feel the resulting crepitus.

== Other uses of the term ==
In soft tissues, crepitus may be produced when gas is introduced into an area where it normally is not present.

Subcutaneous crepitus (or surgical emphysema) is a crackling sound resulting from subcutaneous emphysema, or air trapped in the subcutaneous tissues.

The term "crepitus" also may be used when describing the sounds produced by lung conditions such as interstitial lung disease that also may be referred to as "rales". Although a stethoscope may be needed to detect the instances caused by respiratory diseases, such crepitus often is loud enough to be heard directly by the human ear.

During poor surgical practice, post-surgical complications may involve anaerobic infection by Clostridium perfringens strains that can cause gas gangrene in tissues, which may give rise to crepitus.

== See also ==
- Joint cracking
