= Synovial =

Synovial (/saɪˈnoʊviəl/) may refer to:

- Synovial fluid
- Synovial joint
- Synovial membrane
- Synovial bursa
