= Metatarsophalangeal joints =

Joints between the foot and toes

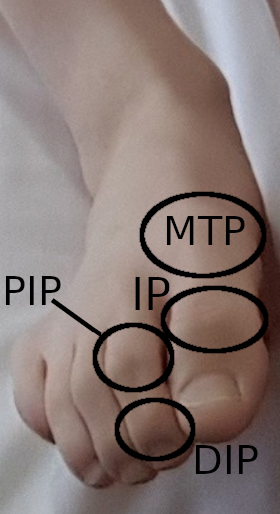
- The MTP, IP, PIP, and DIP joints of the foot: Metatarsophalangeal, at the ball of the foot; Interphalangeal joints of the foot: Interphalangeal (big toe only has one joint); Proximal interphalangeal; Distal interphalangeal

- Bones of the right foot; metatarsalphalangeal joints highlighted in an orange box

Details

Identifiers
- Latin: articulationes metatarsophalangeae
- MeSH: D008683
- TA98: A03.6.10.801
- TA2: 1964
- FMA: 35222 71356, 35222

The metatarsophalangeal joints (MTP joints) are the joints between the metatarsal bones of the foot and the proximal bones (proximal phalanges) of the toes. They are analogous to the knuckles of the hand, and are consequently known as toe knuckles in common speech. They are condyloid joints, meaning that an elliptical or rounded surface (of the metatarsal bones) comes close to a shallow cavity (of the proximal phalanges). The region of skin directly below the joints forms the ball of the foot.

The ligaments are the plantar and two collateral.

== Movements ==
The movements permitted in the metatarsophalangeal joints are flexion, extension, abduction, adduction and circumduction.

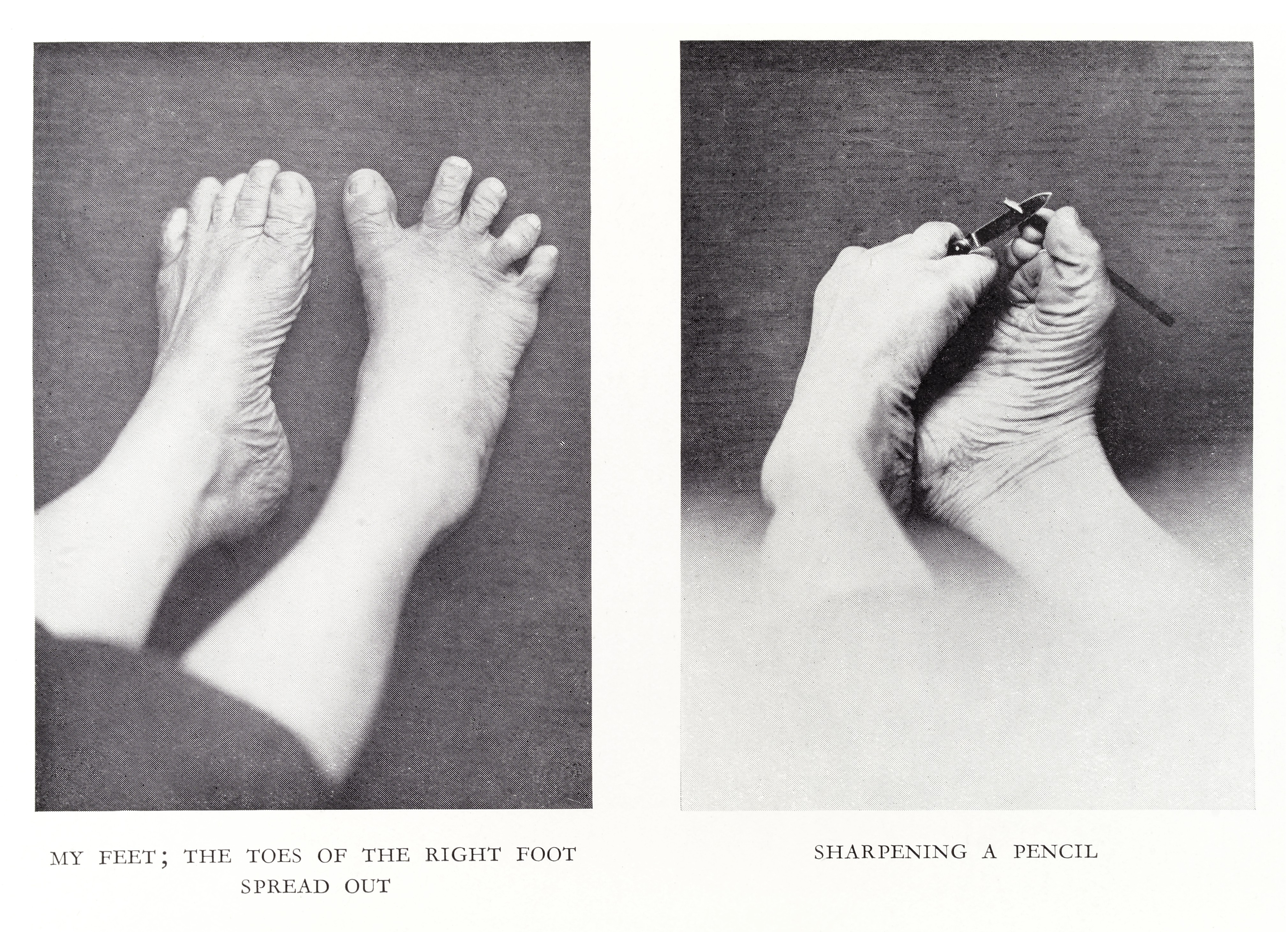
Left: toes adducted (pulled towards the center) and spread (abducted); right, both feet clenched (plantar flexed)

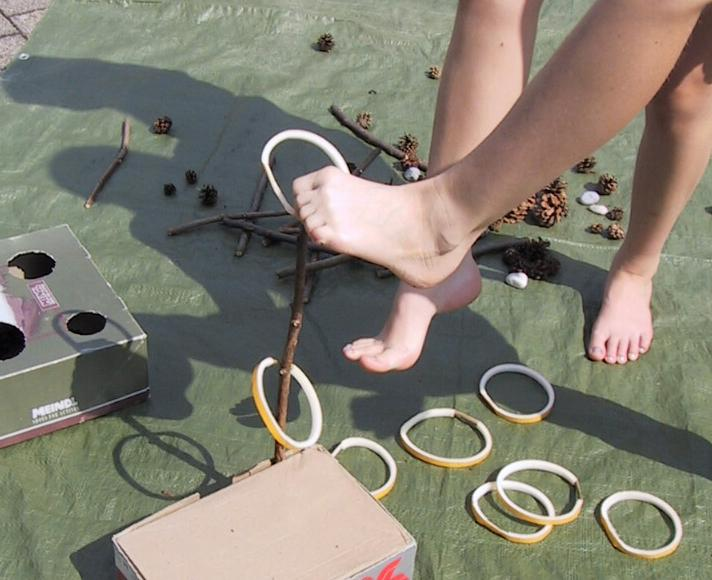
The upper foot is clenching (plantarflexing) at the MTP joints and at the joints of the toes; the central foot is lifting the toes (dorsiflexing) at the MTP joints; and the foot flat on the ground off to the side is in a neutral position.

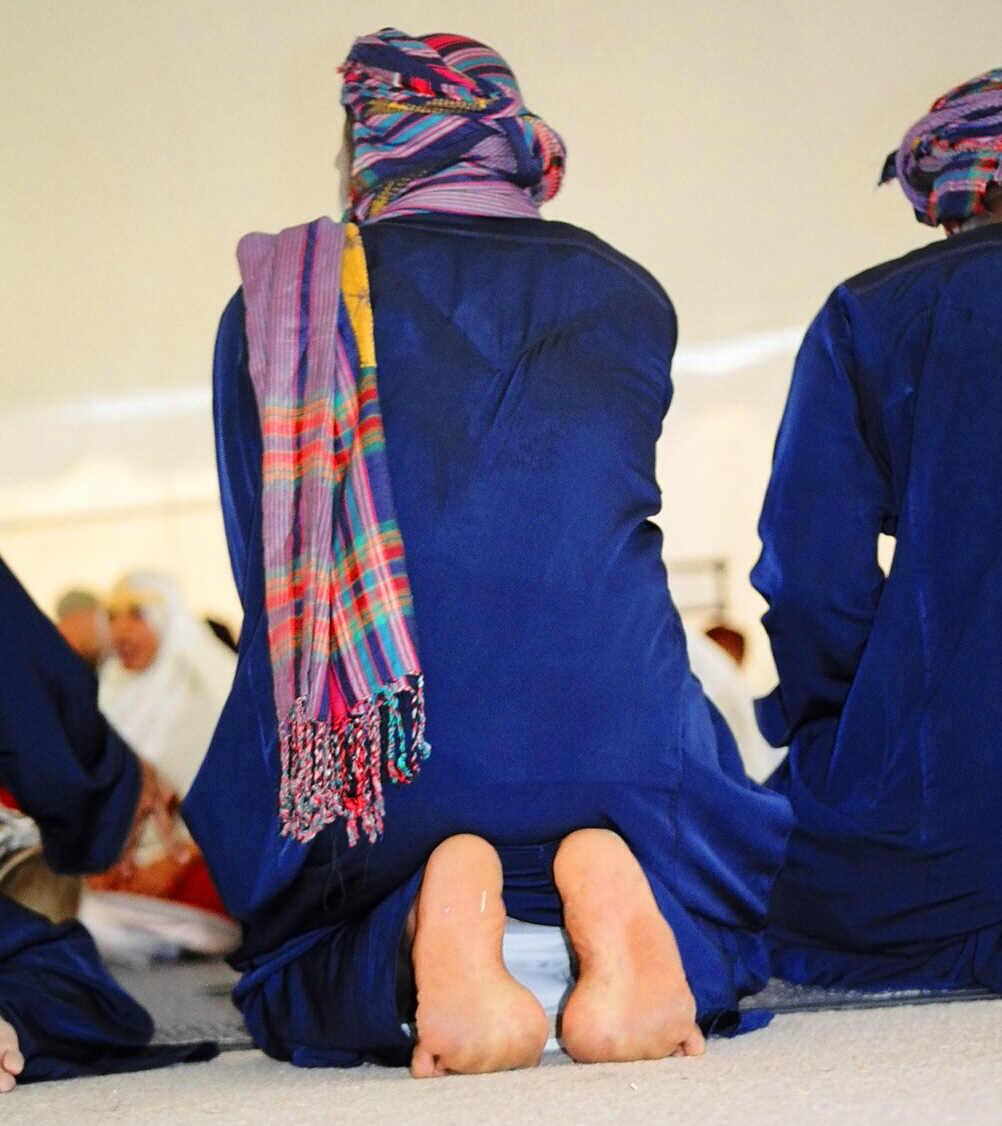
Kneeling with the MTP joints dorsiflexed (except the MTP joint of the little toe)

Measuring the dorsiflexion of the MTP joints

== See also ==
- Bunion
- Hallux rigidus (stiff big toe)
- Metatarsophalangeal joint sprain (turf toe)
- Knuckle
