= Joint cracking =

Bending a person's joints to produce a distinct cracking or popping sound

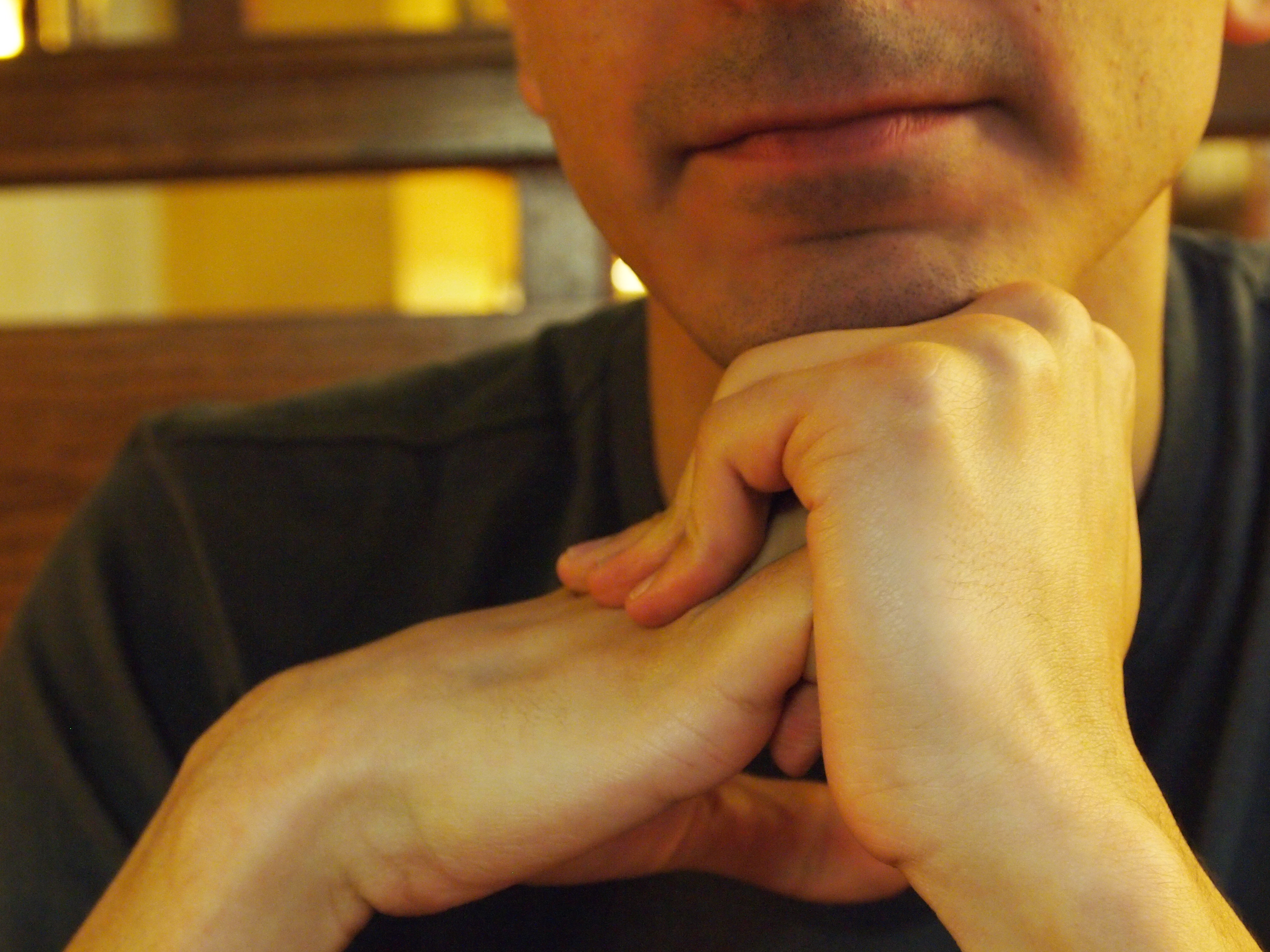
Cracking finger joints makes a distinct cracking or popping sound.

Joint cracking is the manipulation of joints to produce a sharp popping sound and a related, subjective sensation. It is sometimes performed by physical therapists, chiropractors, and osteopaths, in pursuit of a variety of outcomes.

The cracking mechanism involves nitrogen gas that is dissolved in synovial fluid. When the pressure inside the joint cavity is quickly reduced due to mechanical expansion, nitrogen gas is released from the solution, leading to the formation of cavitation bubbles. When these nitrogen bubbles collapse, they create a cracking noise. It takes about 20 minutes for the nitrogen to fully dissolve back into the synovial fluid, which allows the joint to produce another set of cavitation bubbles and generate the cracking sound again.

Voluntary joint cracking is sometimes viewed as a type of "tic" and has been linked to the spectrum of obsessive-compulsive disorder. Two relevant studies highlight this connection:

- Abouhendy and Jawad (2013) discuss compulsive joint clicking and its relation to the obsessive-compulsive spectrum in their case report published in The Primary Care Companion for CNS Disorders.
- Johnson, Linse, and Novoa (2022) address diagnostic, ethical, and legal considerations in treating individuals with compulsive neck cracking in their article published in Cureus.

These studies provide insights into the complexities of this behavior and its implications for treatment.

== Causes ==
MRI of a cracking finger joint depicting cavitation between the bones

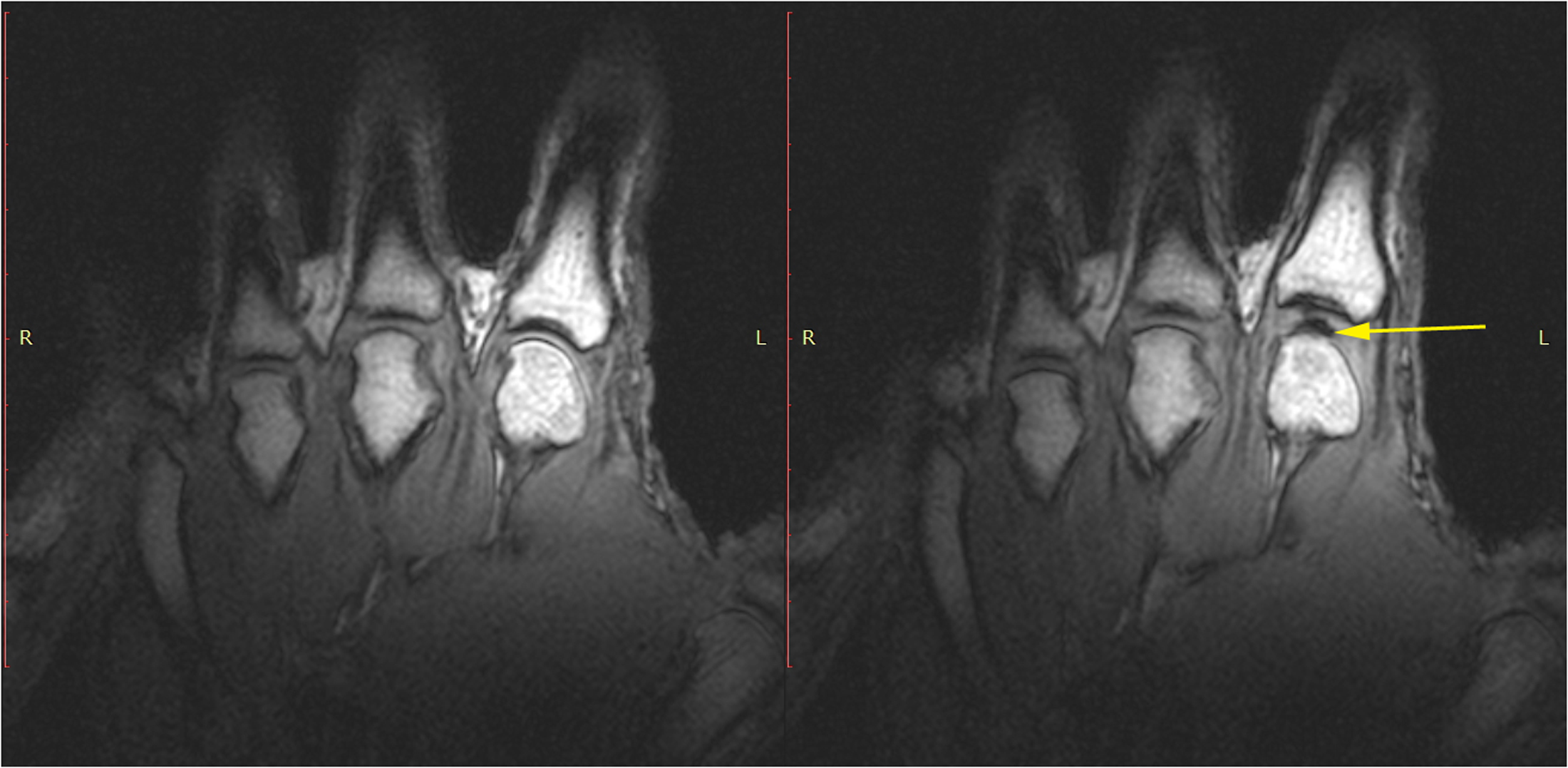
Static images of the hand in the resting phase before cracking (left). The same hand following cracking with the addition of a post-cracking distraction force (right). Note the dark, interarticular void (yellow arrow).

For many decades, the physical mechanism underlying the cracking sound produced by bending, twisting, or compressing joints remained uncertain. Suggested causes included:

- Cavitation within the joint—small cavities of partial vacuum form in the synovial fluid and then rapidly collapse, producing a sharp sound.
- Rapid stretching of ligaments.
- Intra-articular (within-joint) adhesions being broken.
- Formation of bubbles of joint air as the joint is expanded.

There were several hypotheses to explain the cracking of joints. Synovial fluid cavitation has some evidence to support it. When a spinal manipulation is performed, the applied force separates the articular surfaces of a fully encapsulated synovial joint, which in turn creates a reduction in pressure within the joint cavity. In this low-pressure environment, some of the gases that are dissolved in the synovial fluid (which are naturally found in all bodily fluids) leave the solution, making a bubble, or cavity (tribonucleation), which rapidly collapses upon itself, resulting in a "clicking" sound. The contents of the resultant gas bubble are thought to be mainly carbon dioxide, oxygen and nitrogen. The effects of this process will remain for a period of time known as the "refractory period", during which the joint cannot be "re-cracked", which lasts about 20 minutes, while the gases are slowly reabsorbed into the synovial fluid. There is some evidence that ligament laxity may be associated with an increased tendency to cavitate.

In 2015, research indicated that bubbles remained in the fluid after a joint cracked, suggesting that the cracking sound was produced when the bubble within the joint formed, rather than when it collapsed. In 2018, a team in France developed a mathematical simulation to investigate what occurs in a joint just before it cracks. This team concluded that the sound is caused by the collapse of bubbles, while the bubbles observed in the fluid result from a partial collapse. Due to the theoretical nature of this conclusion and the absence of physical experimentation, the scientific community remains unconvinced. The snapping of tendons or scar tissue over a prominence (as in snapping hip syndrome) can also generate a loud snapping or popping sound.

== Relation to arthritis ==
The common old wives' tale that cracking one's knuckles causes arthritis is without scientific evidence. A study published in 2011 examined the hand radiographs of 215 people (aged 50 to 89). It compared the joints of those who regularly cracked their knuckles to those who did not. The study concluded that knuckle-cracking did not cause hand osteoarthritis, no matter how many years or how often a person cracked their knuckles. This early study has been criticized for not taking into consideration the possibility of confounding factors, such as whether the ability to crack one's knuckles is associated with impaired hand functioning rather than being a cause of it.

A 2004 paper published in Arthritis & Rheumatism by American doctor Donald Unger featured an experiment conducted on himself for more than fifty years where he cracked the knuckles of his left hand everyday for more than fifty years but not on his right hand. No arthritis or other ailments formed in either hand. He was awarded the 2009 Ig Nobel Prize in Medicine for this study.

== See also ==
- Crepitus—sounds made by a joint
- Traction
