= Saddle joint =

Type of synovial joint with concave, convex surfaces

Saddle Joint
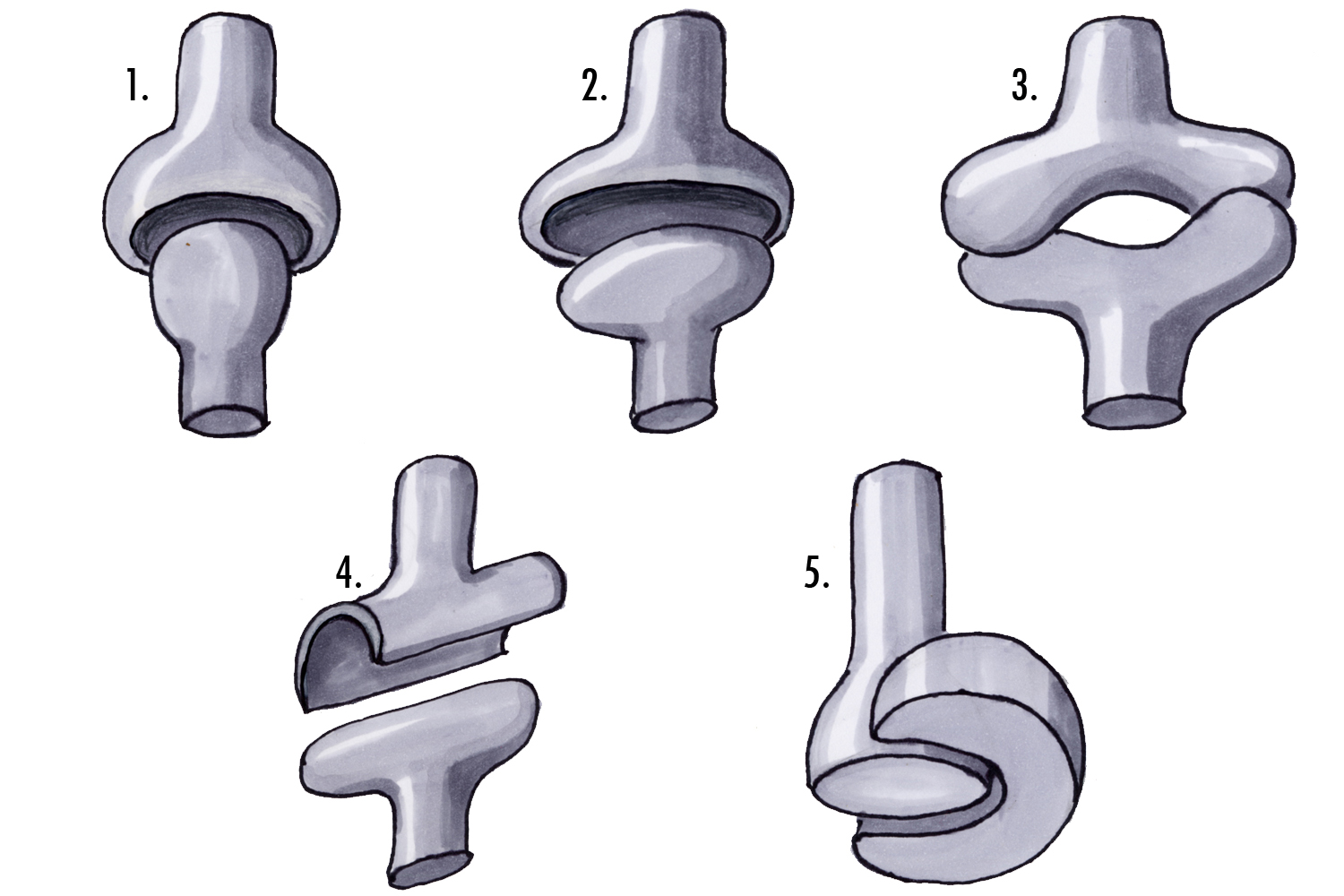
- 1: Ball and socket joint; 2: Condyloid joint (Ellipsoid); 3: Saddle joint; 4 Hinge joint; 5: Pivot joint;

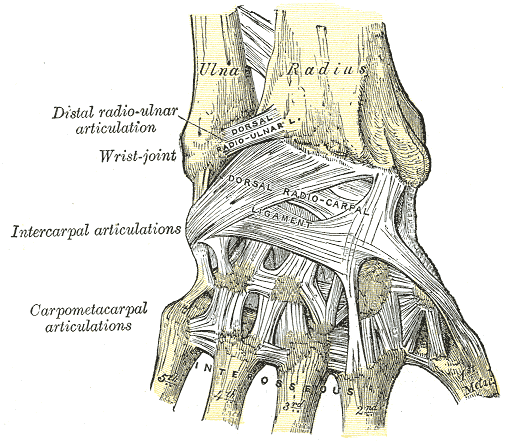
- Ligaments of wrist. Posterior view.

Details

Identifiers
- Latin: articulatio sellaris
- TA98: A03.0.00.048
- TA2: 1560
- FMA: 75298

A saddle joint (sellar joint, articulation by reciprocal reception) is a type of synovial joint in which the opposing surfaces are reciprocally concave and convex. It is found in the thumb, the thorax, the middle ear, and the heel.

== Structure ==
In a saddle joint, one bone surface is concave while another is convex. This creates significant stability.

== Movements ==
The movements of saddle joints are similar to those of the condyloid joint and include flexion, extension, adduction, abduction, and circumduction. However, axial rotation is not allowed. Saddle joints are said to be biaxial, allowing movement in the sagittal and frontal planes.

Examples of saddle joints in the human body include the carpometacarpal joint of the thumb, the sternoclavicular joint of the thorax, the incudomalleolar joint of the middle ear, and the calcaneocuboid joint of the heel.

== Name ==
The term "saddle" arises because the concave-convex bone interaction is compared to a horse rider riding a horse, with both bone surfaces being saddle-shaped. The saddle joint is also known as the sellar joint.
