= Collateral ligaments of interphalangeal joints of foot =

Ligaments of the foot

Details
- From: phalanx
- To: phalanx

Identifiers
- Latin: ligamenta collateralia articulationum interphalangearum pedis
- TA98: A03.6.10.902
- TA2: 1972
- FMA: 71426

The collateral ligaments of the interphalangeal joints of the foot also sometimes called the accessory collateral ligaments of the foot, are fibrous bands on the medial and lateral sides the interphalangeal joints of the toes.
