= Pivot joint =

Type of joint between bones in the body

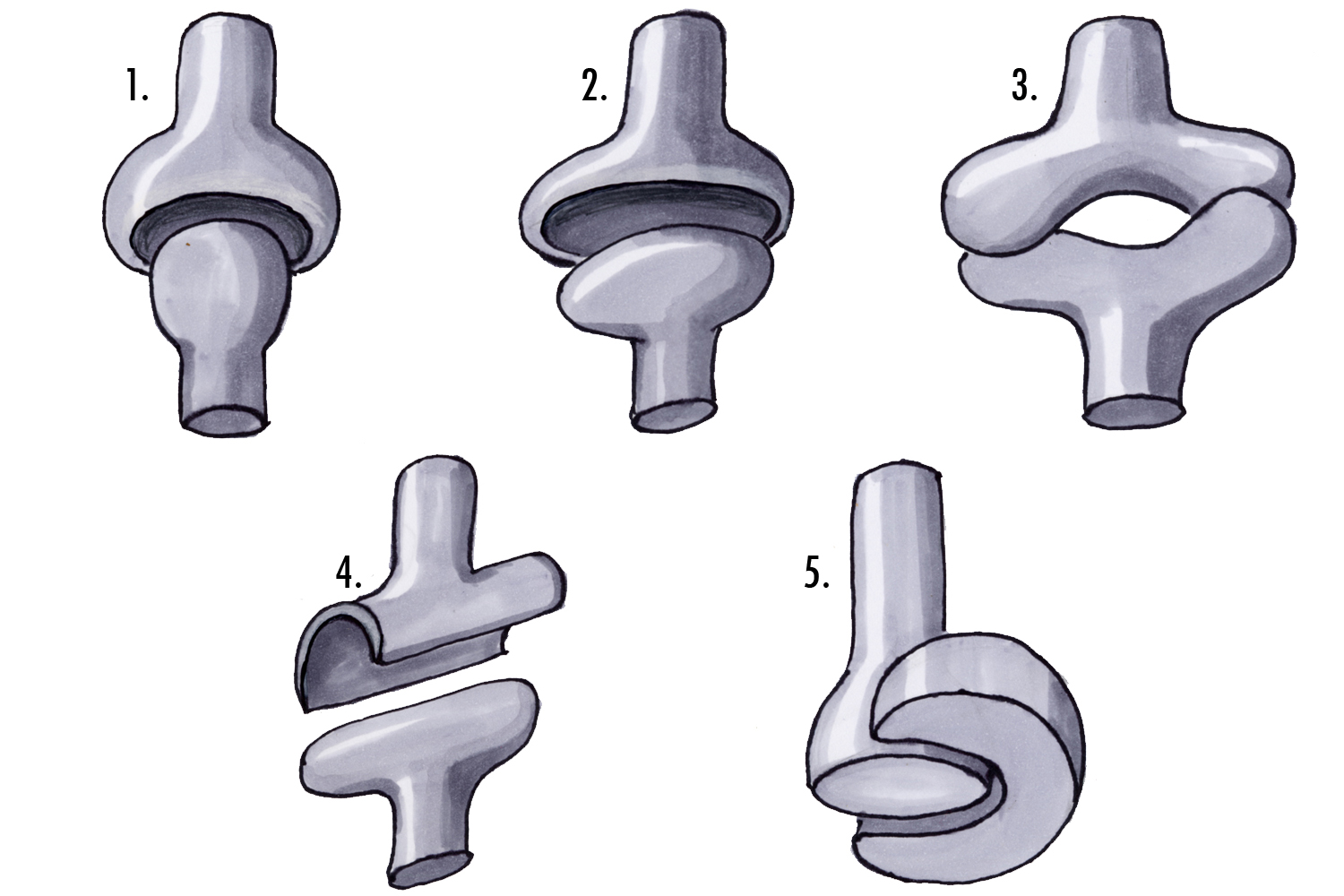
- 1: Ball and socket joint; 2: Condyloid joint (Ellipsoid); 3: Saddle joint; 4 Hinge joint; 5: Pivot joint;

Details

Identifiers
- Latin: articulatio trochoidea
- TA98: A03.0.00.045
- TA2: 1557
- FMA: 75294

In animal anatomy, a pivot joint (trochoid joint, rotary joint or lateral ginglymus) is a type of synovial joint whose movement axis is parallel to the long axis of the proximal bone, which typically has a convex articular surface.

According to one classification system, a pivot joint like the other synovial joint—the hinge joint has one degree of freedom. The degrees of freedom of a joint is not the same as a joint's range of motion.

== Movements ==
Pivot joints allow rotation, which can be external (for example when rotating an arm outward), or internal (as in rotating an arm inward). When rotating the forearm, these movements are typically called pronation and supination. In the standard anatomical position, the forearms are supinated, which means that the palms are facing forward, and the thumbs are pointing away from the body. In contrast, a forearm in pronation would have the palm facing backward and the thumb would be closer to the body, pointing medially.

== Examples ==
Examples of a pivot joint include:

- Proximal radioulnar joint
- Distal radioulnar joint
- Median atlanto-axial joint

In contrast, spherical joints (or ball and socket joints) such as the hip joint permit rotation and all other directional movement, while pivot joints only permit rotation.
