= Interphalangeal joints of the foot =

Hinge joints connecting the phalanx bones of each toe

Interphalangeal joints of foot
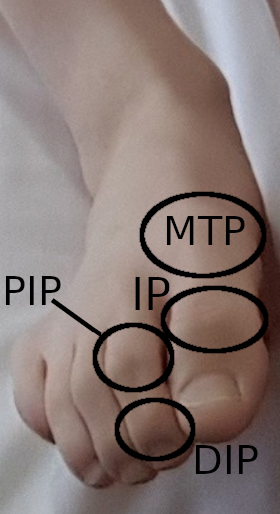
- The MTP, IP, PIP, and DIP joints of the foot: MetaTarsoPhalangeal; InterPhalangeal (big toe only has one joint); Proximal InterPhalangeal; Distal InterPhalangeal

- Bones of the foot. Interphalangeal joints highlighted (orange background area)

Details

Identifiers
- Latin: articulationes interphalangeae pedis
- MeSH: D014033
- TA98: A03.6.10.901
- TA2: 1968
- FMA: 35225 71357, 35225

The interphalangeal joints of the foot are the joints between the phalanx bones of the toes in the feet.

Since the great toe only has two phalanx bones (proximal and distal phalanges), it only has one interphalangeal joint, which is often abbreviated as the "IP joint". The rest of the toes each have three phalanx bones (proximal, middle, and distal phalanges), so they have two interphalangeal joints: the proximal interphalangeal joint between the proximal and middle phalanges (abbreviated "PIP joint") and the distal interphalangeal joint between the middle and distal phalanges (abbreviated "DIP joint").

All interphalangeal joints are ginglymoid (hinge) joints, and each has a plantar (underside) and two collateral ligaments. In the arrangement of these ligaments, extensor tendons supply the places of dorsal ligaments, which is similar to that in the metatarsophalangeal articulations.

Toe bones or phalanges of the foot. Note the big toe has no middle phalanx.
People vary; sometimes the smallest toe also has none (not shown).

Distal phalanges of the foot
Middle phalanges of the foot
Proximal phalanges of the foot

== Movements ==
The only movements permitted in the joints of the digits are flexion and extension; these movements are more extensive between the first and second phalanges than between the second and third. The flexor hallucis longus and flexor digitorum longus flex the interphalangeal joint of the big toe and lateral four toes, respectively. The tendons of both of these muscles cross as they reach their distal attachments. In other words, the flexor hallucis longus arises laterally, while the flexor digitorum longus arises medially.

The amount of flexion is very considerable, but extension is limited by the plantar and collateral ligaments.

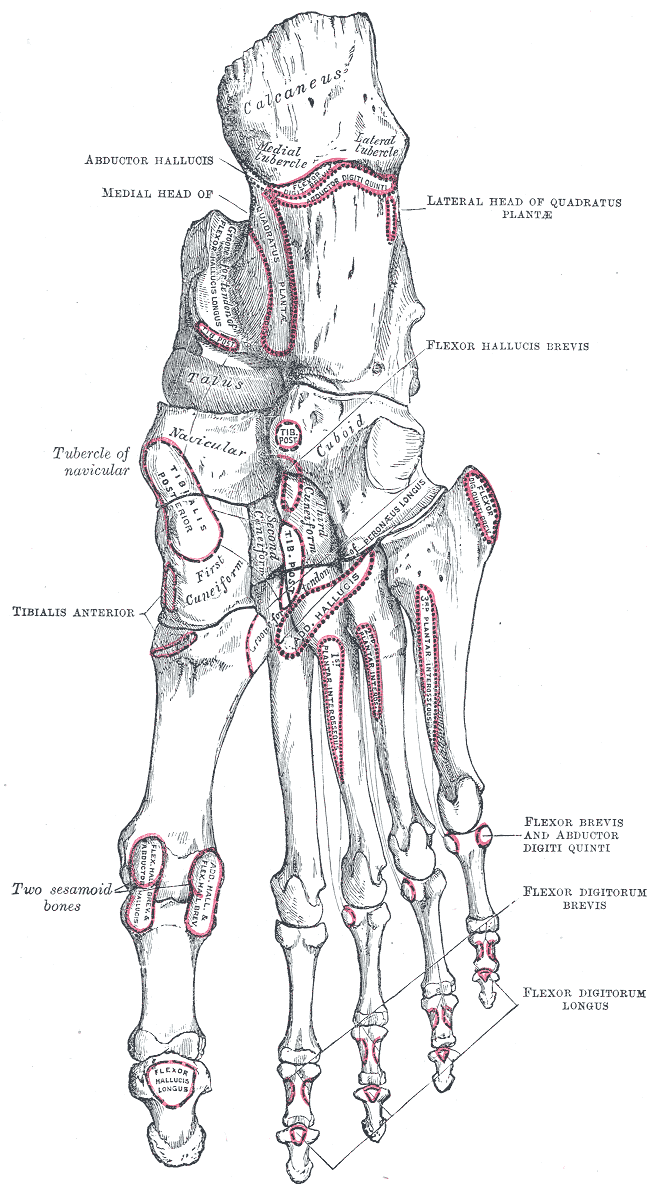
Bones of the right foot, bottom (plantar) surface. Joints are not labelled, but region is visible.

== See also ==
- Interphalangeal joints of hand
- Metatarsophalangeal joints
