= Hinge joint =

Type of bone joint in human anatomy

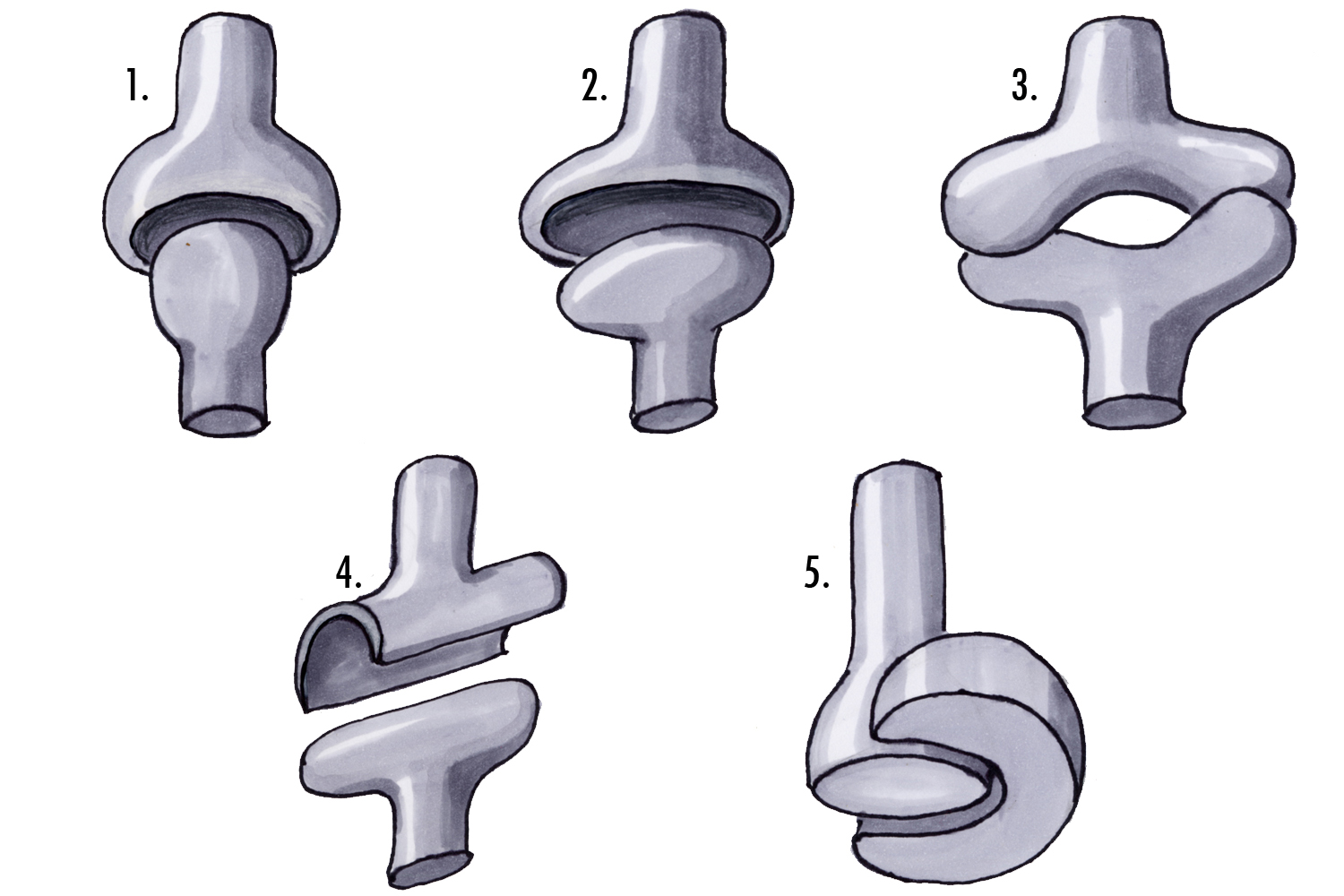
- 1: Ball and socket joint; 2: Condyloid joint (Ellipsoid); 3: Saddle joint; 4: Hinge joint; 5: Pivot joint

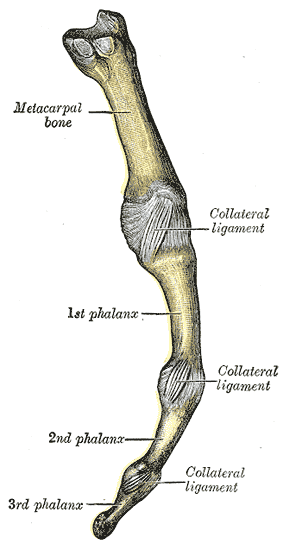
- Metacarpophalangeal articulation and articulations of digit. Ulnar aspect.

Details

Identifiers
- Latin: articulatio ginglymus
- TA98: A03.0.00.046
- TA2: 1558
- FMA: 75296

A hinge joint (ginglymus or ginglymoid) is a bone joint where the articular surfaces are molded to each other in such a manner as to permit motion only in one plane. According to one classification system they are said to be uniaxial (having one degree of freedom).

The direction which the distal bone takes in this motion is rarely in the same plane as that of the axis of the proximal bone; there is usually a certain amount of deviation from the straight line during flexion.

The articular surfaces of the bones are connected by strong collateral ligaments.

Examples of ginglymoid joints are the interphalangeal joints of the hand and those of the foot and the joint between the humerus and ulna. The knee joints and ankle joints are less typical, as they allow a slight degree of rotation or side-to-side movement in certain positions of the limb. The knee is the largest hinge joint in the human body.

Hinge and pivot joints are both types of synovial joint. A hinge joint can be considered a modified sellar/saddle joint, with reduced movement.
