= Collateral ligament of interphalangeal joints of hand =

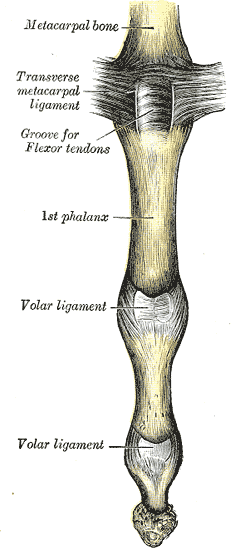
- Metacarpophalangeal articulation and articulations of digit. Volar aspect.

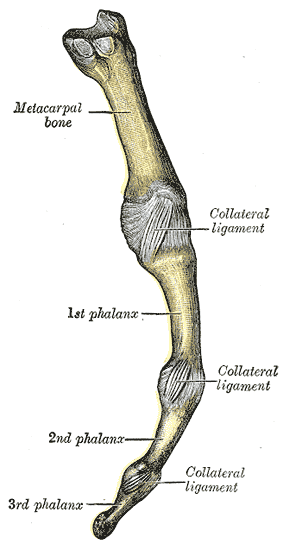
- Metacarpophalangeal articulation and articulations of digit. Ulnar aspect.

Details

Identifiers
- Latin: ligamenta collateralia articulationum interphalangealium manus

The collateral ligaments of interphalangeal joints are ligaments of the interphalangeal joints of the hand. They limit extension at these joints (together with the palmar ligaments).

On each side of the interphalangeal joints of the fingers are diagonally placed fibrous bands. The proximal ends of the bands are near the dorsal phalanges of the hand and the distal ends of the bands are near the palmar margins of the digits.
