= Condyloid joint =

Condyle that is received into a small joint in the wrist

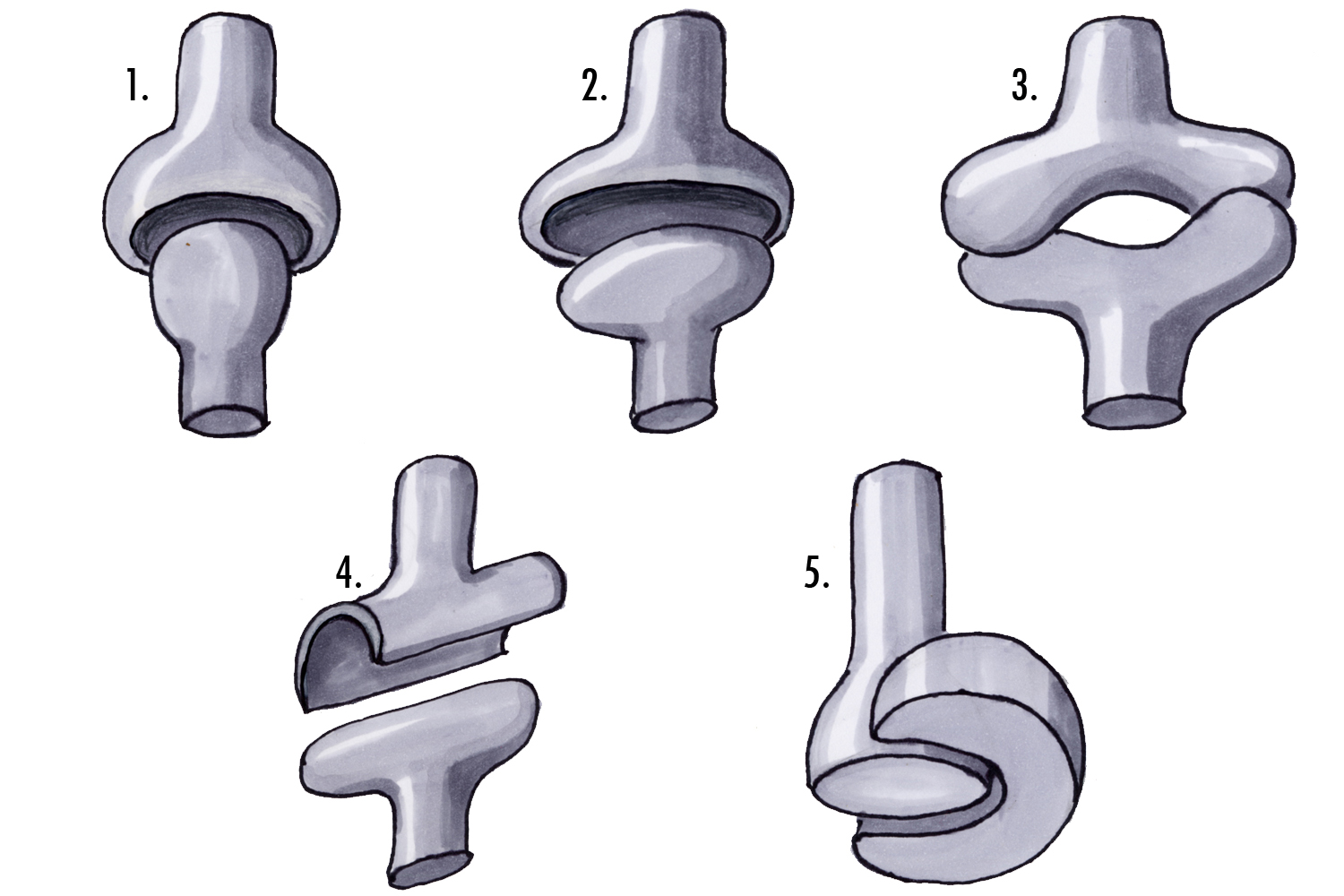
- 1: Ball and socket joint; 2: Condyloid joint (Ellipsoid); 3: Saddle joint; 4 Hinge joint; 5: Pivot joint;

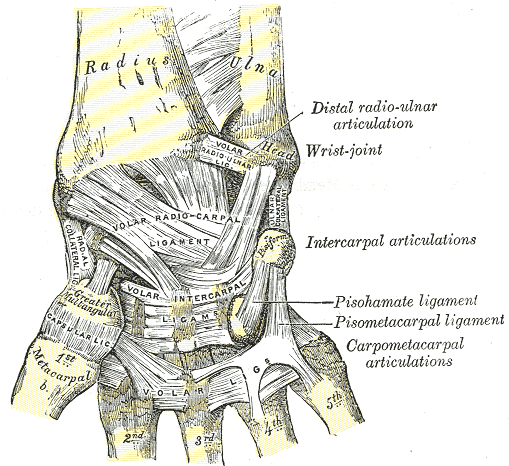
- Ligaments of wrist. Palmaris view

Details

Identifiers
- Latin: articulatio ellipsoidea
- TA98: A03.0.00.049
- TA2: 1561
- FMA: 75299

A condyloid joint (also called condylar, ellipsoidal, or bicondylar) is an ovoid articular surface, or condyle that is received into an elliptical cavity. This permits movement in two planes, allowing flexion, extension, adduction, abduction, and circumduction.

== Examples ==
Examples include:

- the wrist-joint
- metacarpophalangeal joints
- metatarsophalangeal joints
- atlanto-occipital joints

These are also called ellipsoid joints. The oval-shaped condyle of one bone fits into the elliptical cavity of the other bone. These joints allow biaxial movements — i.e., forward and backward, or from side to side, but not rotation. Radiocarpal joint and metacarpophalangeal joint are examples of condyloid joints.

An example of an ellipsoid joint is the wrist; it functions similarly to the ball and socket joint except is unable to rotate 360 degrees; it prohibits axial rotation.
