= Phalanx bone =

Digital bone in the hands and feet of most vertebrates

- Bones of the hand

- Bones of the foot

Details
- Articulations: Metacarpophalangeal, metatarsophalangeal, interphalangeal

Identifiers
- Latin: phalanx pl. phalanges

The phalanges (/fəˈlændʒiːz/; sing. phalanx /ˈfælæŋks, ˈfeɪlæŋks/) are digital bones in the hands and feet of most vertebrates. In primates, the thumbs and big toes have two phalanges each, while the other digits have three phalanges each. The phalanges are classed as long bones.

== Structure ==
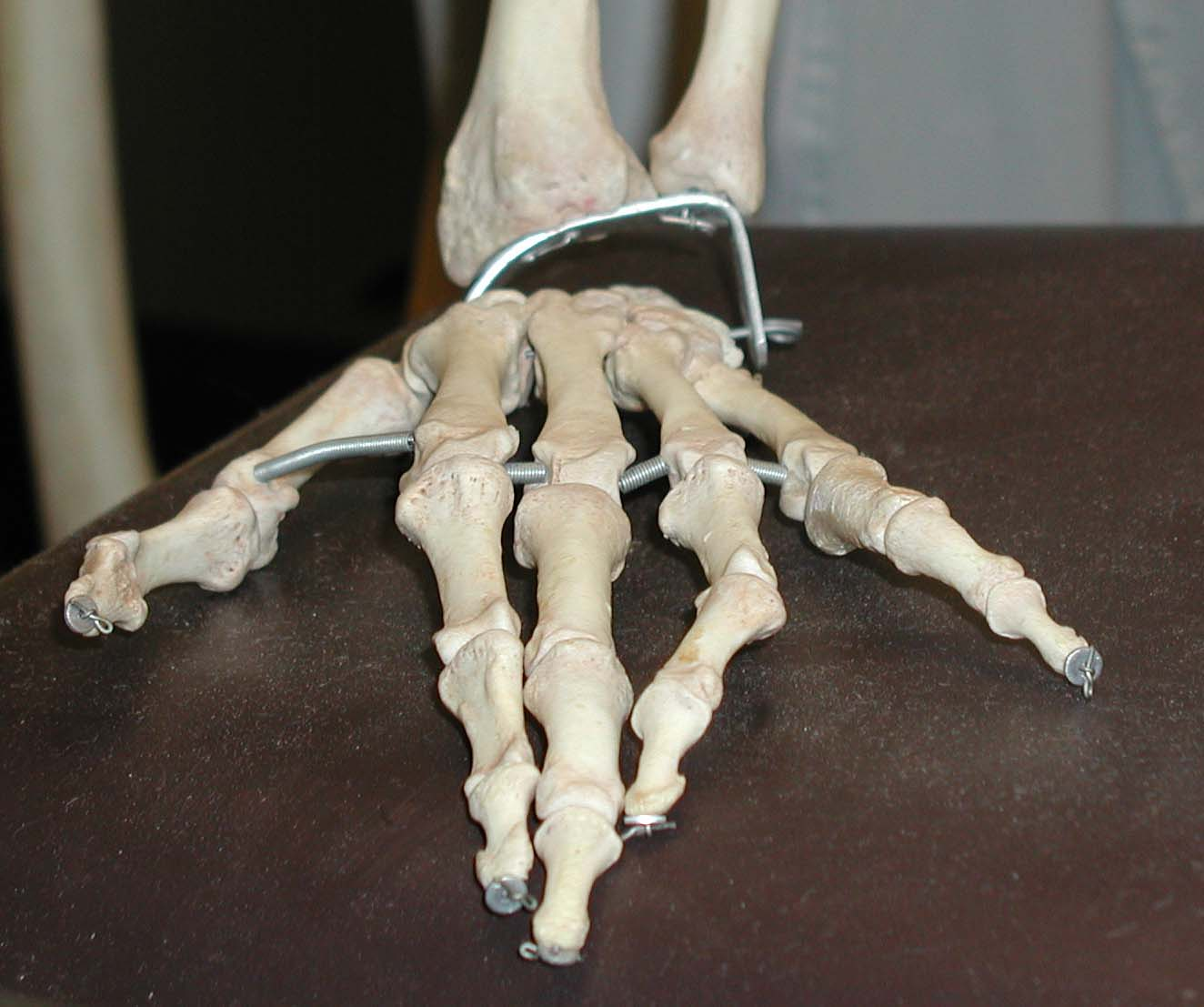
The phalanges in a human hand

Toe bones, or phalanges of the foot. Note the big toe has no middle phalanx.
People vary; sometimes the smallest toe also has none (not shown).

Distal phalanges of the foot
Middle phalanges of the foot
Proximal phalanges of the foot

The phalanges are the bones that make up the fingers of the hand and the toes of the foot. There are 56 phalanges in the human body, with fourteen on each hand and foot. Three phalanges are present on each finger and toe, with the exception of the thumb and big toe, which possess only two. The middle and far phalanges of the fourth and fifth toes are often fused together (symphalangism). The phalanges of the hand are commonly known as the finger bones. The phalanges of the foot differ from the hand in that they are often shorter and more compressed, especially in the proximal phalanges, those closest to the torso.

A phalanx is named according to whether it is proximal, middle, or distal and its associated finger or toe. The proximal phalanges are those that are closest to the hand or foot. In the hand, the prominent, knobby ends of the phalanges are known as knuckles. The proximal phalanges join with the metacarpals of the hand or metatarsals of the foot at the metacarpophalangeal joint or metatarsophalangeal joint. The intermediate phalanx is not only intermediate in location, but usually also in size. The thumb and large toe do not have middle phalanges. The distal phalanges are the bones at the tips of the fingers or toes. The proximal, intermediate, and distal phalanges articulate with one another through interphalangeal joints of hand and interphalangeal joints of the foot.

=== Bone anatomy ===
Each phalanx consists of a central part, called the body, and two extremities.

- The body is flat on either side, concave on the palmar surface, and convex on the dorsal surface. Its sides are marked with rough areas giving attachment to fibrous sheaths of flexor tendons. It tapers from above downwards.
- The proximal extremities of the bones of the first row present oval, concave articular surfaces, broader from side to side than from front to back. The proximal extremity of each of the bones of the second and third rows presents a double concavity separated by a median ridge.
- The distal extremities are smaller than the proximal, and each ends in two condyles (knuckles) separated by a shallow groove; the articular surface extends farther on the palmar than on the dorsal surface, a condition best marked in the bones of the first row.

In the foot, the proximal phalanges have a body that is compressed from side to side, convex above, and concave below. The base is concave, and the head presents a trochlear surface for articulation with the second phalanx. The middle are remarkably small and short, but rather broader than the proximal. The distal phalanges, as compared with the distal phalanges of the finger, are smaller and are flattened from above downward; each presents a broad base for articulation with the corresponding bone of the second row, and an expanded distal extremity for the support of the nail and end of the toe.

==== Distal phalanx ====
In the hand, the distal phalanges are flat on their palmar surface, small, and with a roughened, elevated surface of horseshoe form on the palmar surface, supporting the finger pulp. The flat, wide expansions found at the tips of the distal phalanges are called "apical tufts". They support the fingertip pads and nails. The phalanx of the thumb has a pronounced insertion for the flexor pollicis longus (asymmetric towards the radial side), an ungual fossa, and a pair of unequal ungual spines (the ulnar being more prominent). This asymmetry is necessary to ensure that the thumb pulp is always facing the pulps of the other digits, an osteological configuration which provides the maximum contact surface with held objects.

In the foot, the distal phalanges are flat on their dorsal surface. It is largest proximally and tapers to the distal end. The proximal part of the phalanx presents a broad base for articulation with the middle phalanx, and an expanded distal extremity for the support of the nail and end of the toe. The phalanx ends in a crescent-shaped rough cap of bone epiphysis – the apical tuft (or ungual tuberosity/process) which covers a larger portion of the phalanx on the volar side than on the dorsal side. Two lateral ungual spines project proximally from the apical tuft. Near the base of the shaft are two lateral tubercles. Between these a V-shaped ridge extending proximally serves for the insertion of the flexor pollicis longus. Another ridge at the base serves for the insertion of the extensor aponeurosis. The flexor insertion is sided by two fossae – the ungual fossa distally and the proximopalmar fossa proximally.

=== Development ===
The number of phalanges in animals is often expressed as a "phalangeal formula" that indicates the numbers of phalanges in digits, beginning from the innermost medial or proximal. For example, humans have a 2/3/3/3/3 formula for the hand, meaning that the thumb has two phalanges, whilst the other fingers each have three.

In the distal phalanges of the hand the centres for the bodies appear at the distal extremities of the phalanges, instead of at the middle of the bodies, as in the other phalanges. Moreover, of all the bones of the hand, the distal phalanges are the first to ossify.

== Function ==
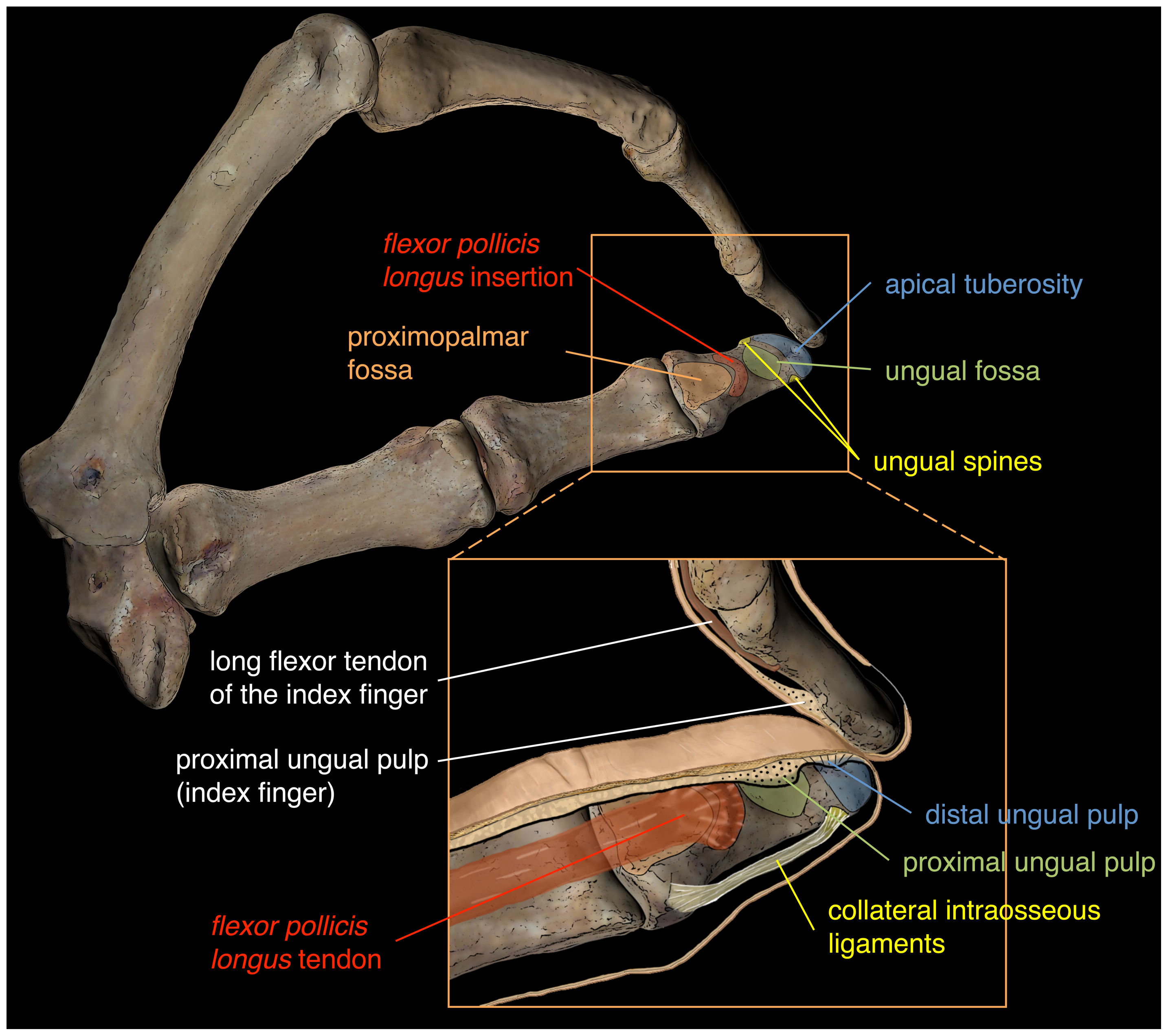
Thumb and index finger of right hand during pad-to-pad precision grasping in ulnar view.

The distal phalanges of ungulates carry and shape nails and claws and these in primates are referred to as the ungual phalanges.

== Clinical significance ==
Fractures of the finger phalanges can result from falls, crushing injuries, or sports injuries. Signs include swelling, bruising, tenderness, deformity, and reduced movement of the affected finger. Associated injuries may involve nearby tendons, nerves or ligaments.

== History of phalanges ==
=== Etymology ===
Phalanx refers to an ancient Greek army formation in which soldiers stand side by side, several rows deep, like an arrangement of fingers or toes.

=== Other animals ===
Most land mammals, including humans, have a 2/3/3/3/3 formula in both the hands (or paws) and feet. Primitive reptiles usually had the formula 2/3/4/4/5, and this pattern, with some modification, remained in many later reptiles and in the mammal-like reptiles. The phalangeal formula in the flippers of cetaceans (marine mammals) varies widely due to hyperphalangy (the increase in number of phalanx bones in the digits). In humpback whales, for example, the phalangeal formula is 0/2/7/7/3; in pilot whales the formula is 1/10/7/2/1.

In vertebrates, proximal phalanges have a similar placement in the corresponding limbs, be they paw, wing or fin. In many species, they are the longest and thickest phalanx ("finger" bone). The middle phalanx also has a corresponding place in their limbs, whether they be paw, wing, hoof or fin.

The distal phalanges are cone-shaped in most mammals, including most primates, but relatively wide and flat in humans.

==== Primates ====
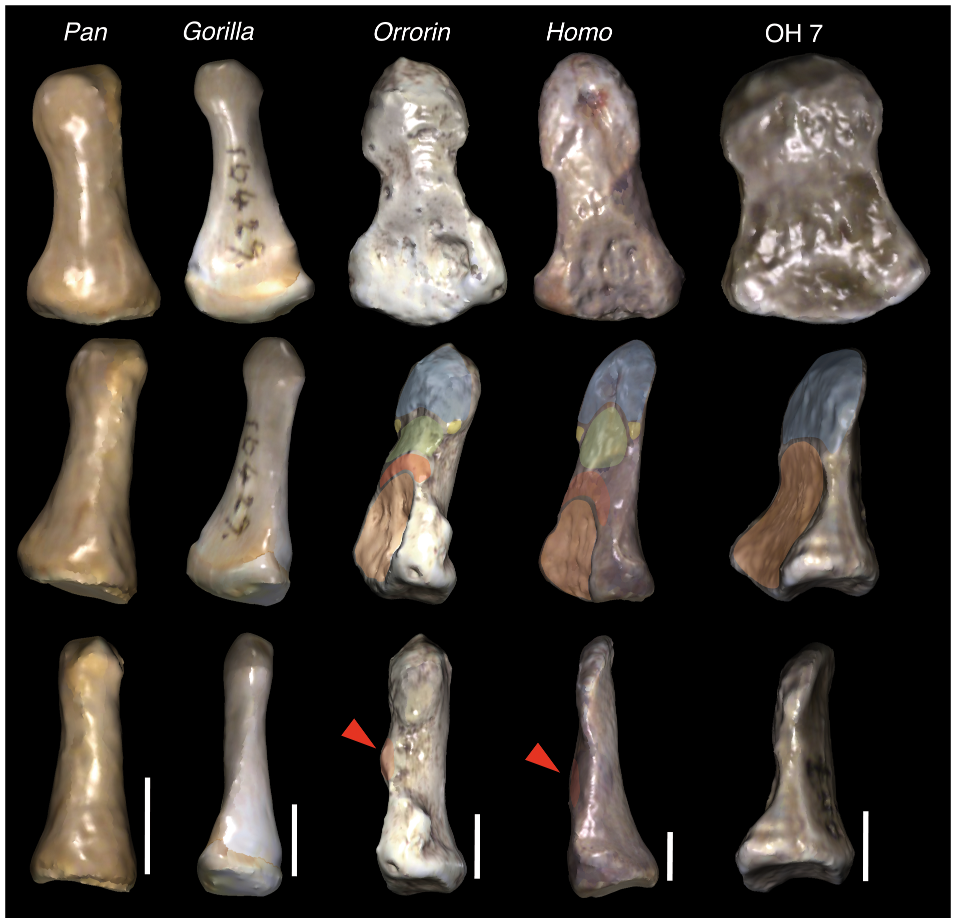
Morphological comparisons of pollical distal phalanges in African apes, extant humans and selected hominins. Although with several morphological differences, all the features related to refined manipulation in modern humans are already present in the late Miocene Orrorin.

The morphology of the distal phalanges of human thumbs closely reflects an adaptation for a refined precision grip with pad-to-pad contact. This has traditionally been associated with the advent of stone tool-making. However, the intrinsic hand proportions of australopiths and the resemblance between human hands and the short hands of Miocene apes, suggest that human hand proportions are largely plesiomorphic (as found in ancestral species) – in contrast to the derived elongated hand pattern and poorly developed thumb musculature of other extant hominoids.

In Neanderthals, the apical tufts were expanded and more robust than in modern and early Upper Paleolithic humans. A proposal that Neanderthal distal phalanges was an adaptation to colder climate (than in Africa) is not supported by a recent comparison showing that in hominins, cold-adapted populations possessed smaller apical tufts than do warm-adapted populations.

In non-human, living primates the apical tufts vary in size, but they are never larger than in humans. Enlarged apical tufts, to the extent they actually reflect expanded digital pulps, may have played a significant role in enhancing friction between the hand and held objects during Neolithic toolmaking.

Among non-human primates phylogenesis and style of locomotion appear to play a role in apical tuft size. Suspensory primates and New World monkeys have the smallest apical tufts, while terrestrial quadrupeds and Strepsirrhines have the largest. A study of the fingertip morphology of four small-bodied New World monkey species, indicated a correlation between increasing small-branch foraging and reduced flexor and extensor tubercles in distal phalanges and broadened distal parts of distal phalanges, coupled with expanded apical pads and developed epidermal ridges. This suggests that widened distal phalanges were developed in arboreal primates, rather than in quadrupedal terrestrial primates.

==== Cetaceans ====
Whales exhibit hyperphalangy. Hyperphalangy is an increase in the number of phalanges beyond the plesiomorphic mammal condition of three phalanges-per-digit. Hyperphalangy was present among extinct marine reptiles -- ichthyosaurs, plesiosaurs, and mosasaurs -- but not other marine mammals, leaving whales as the only marine mammals to develop this characteristic. The evolutionary process continued over time, and a very derived form of hyperphalangy, with six or more phalanges per digit, evolved convergently in rorqual whales and oceanic dolphins, and was likely associated with another wave of signaling within the interdigital tissues.

==== Other mammals ====
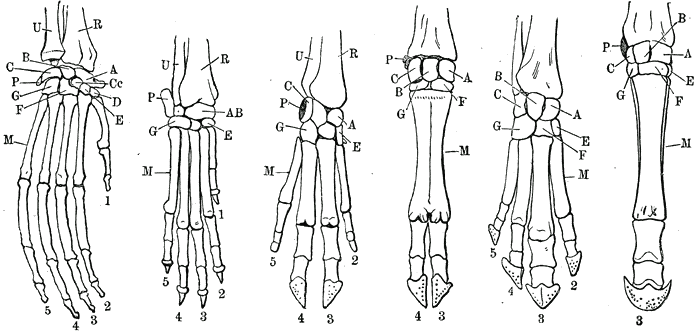
Comparison of the phalanges of an orangutan, dog, pig, cow, tapir and horse

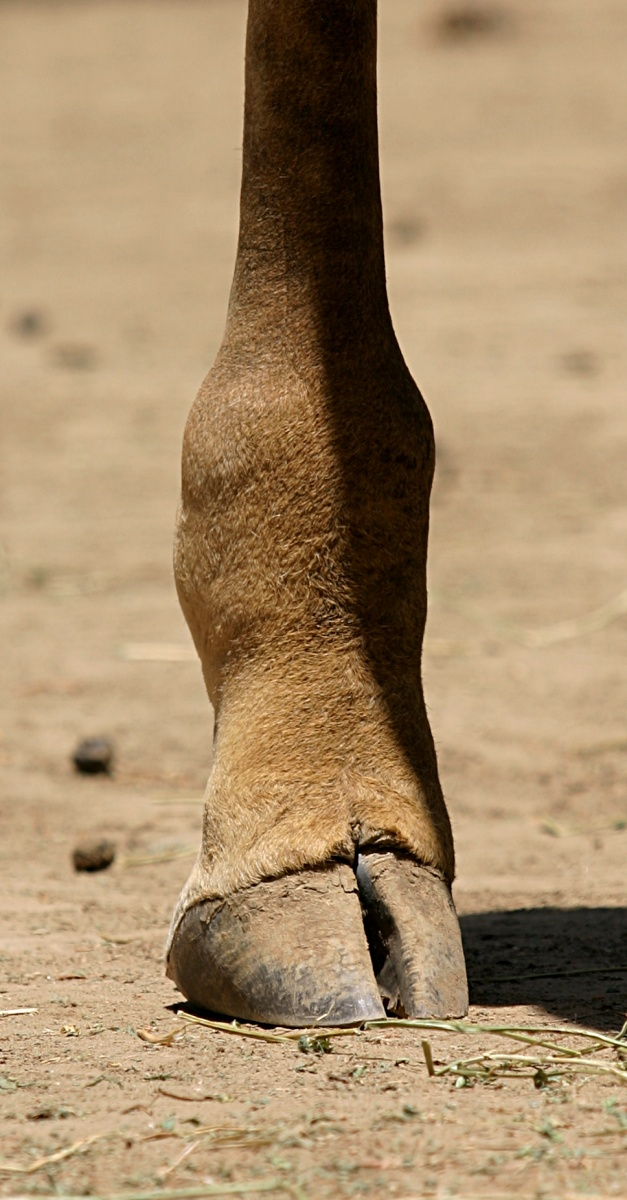
Distal phalanges of a Masai giraffe
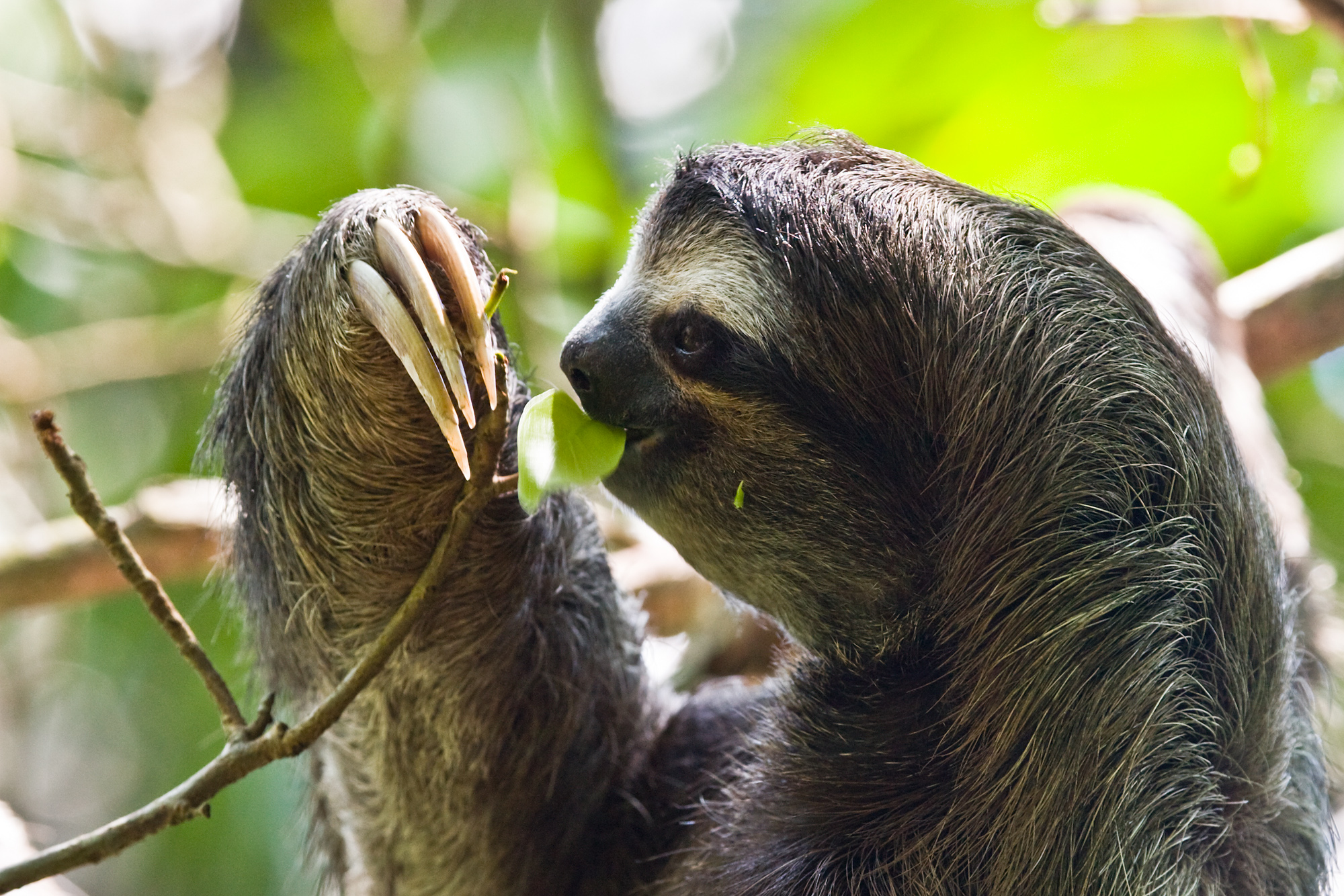
Three-fingered sloth

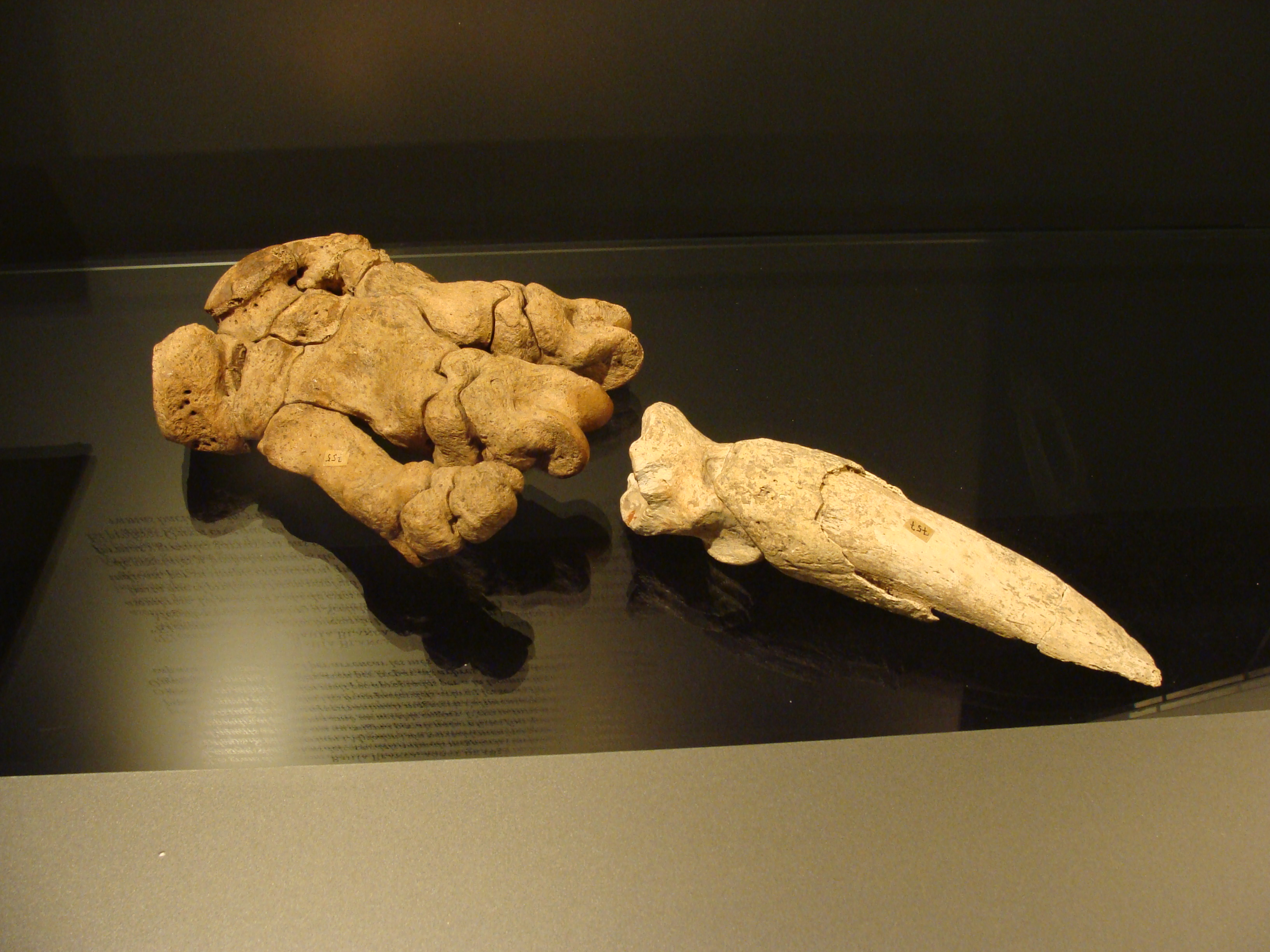
Terminal phalanx of a Scelidotherium ground sloth

In ungulates (hoofed mammals) the forelimb is optimized for speed and endurance by a combination of length of stride and rapid step; the proximal forelimb segments are short with large muscles, while the distal segments are elongated with less musculature. In two of the major groups of ungulates, odd-toed and even-toed ungulates, what remain of the "hands" – the metacarpal and phalangeal bones – are elongated to the extent that they serve little use beyond locomotion. The giraffe, the largest even-toed ungulate, has large terminal phalanges and fused metacarpal bones able to absorb the stress from running.

The sloth spends its life hanging upside-down from branches, and has highly specialized third and fourth digits for the purpose. They have short and squat proximal phalanges with much longer terminal phalanges. They have vestigial second and fifth metacarpals, and their palm extends to the distal interphalangeal joints. The arboreal specialization of these terminal phalanges makes it impossible for the sloth to walk on the ground where the animal has to drag its body with its claws.

== Additional images ==
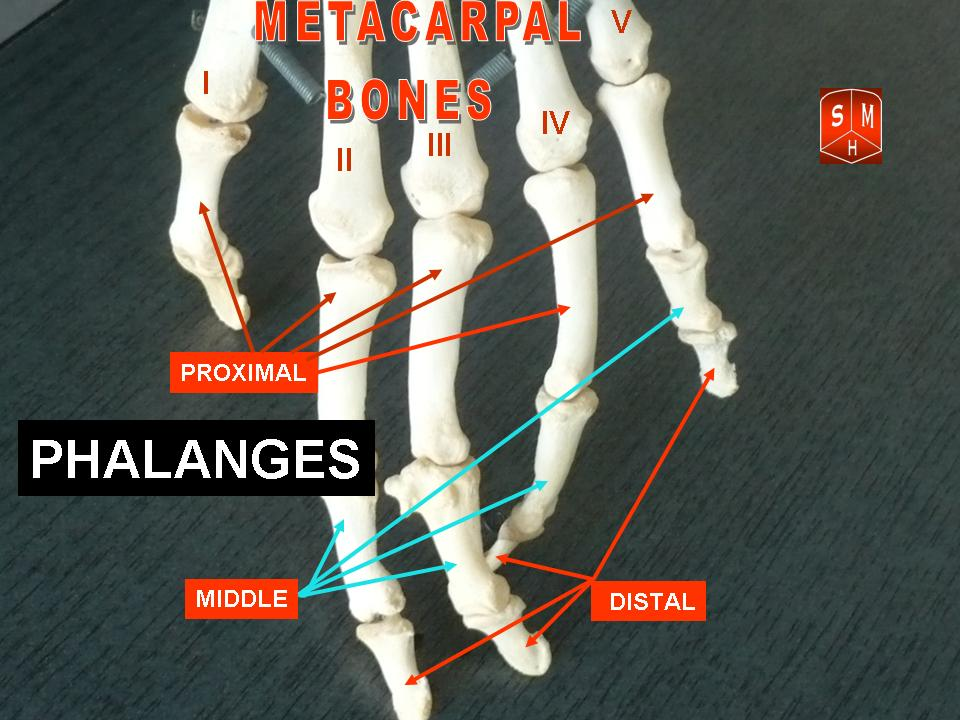
Phalanges

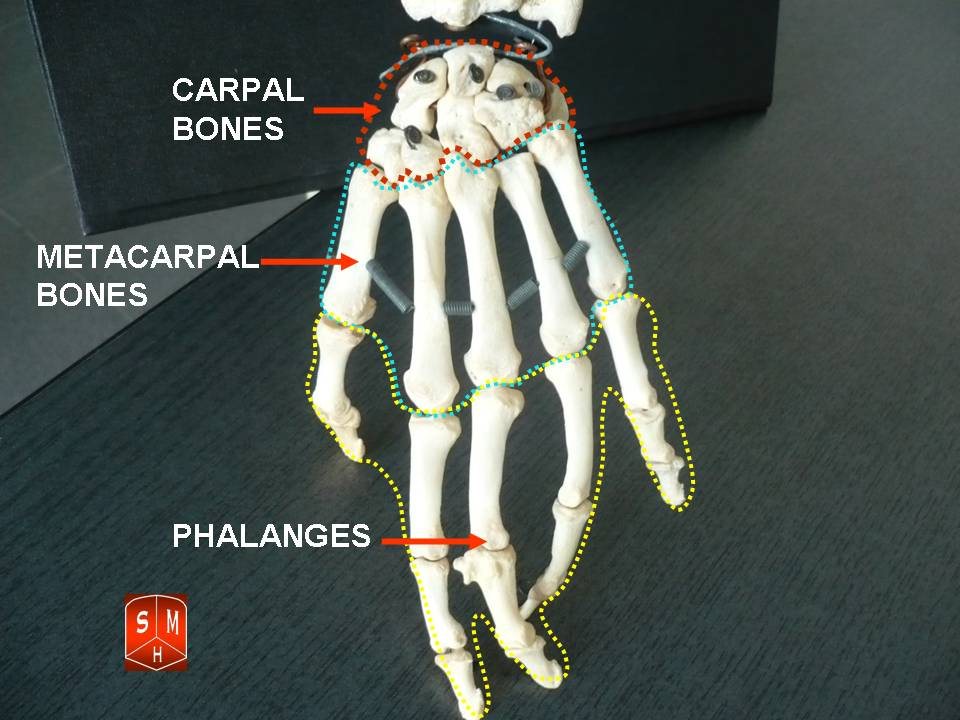
Phalanges

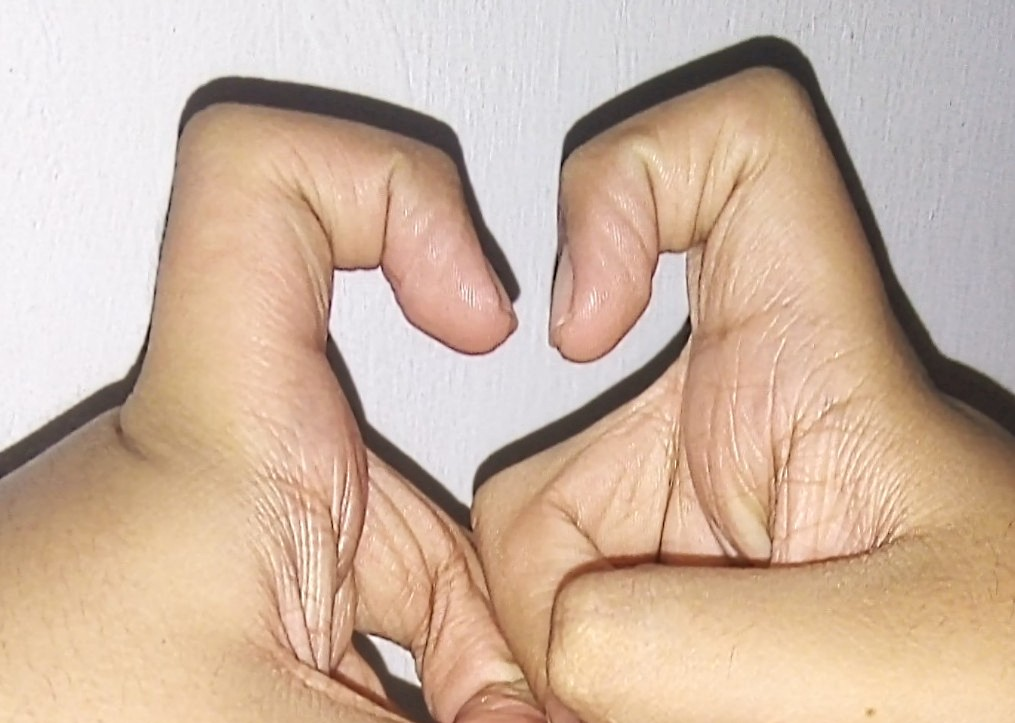
Unilateral extra phalangeal crease

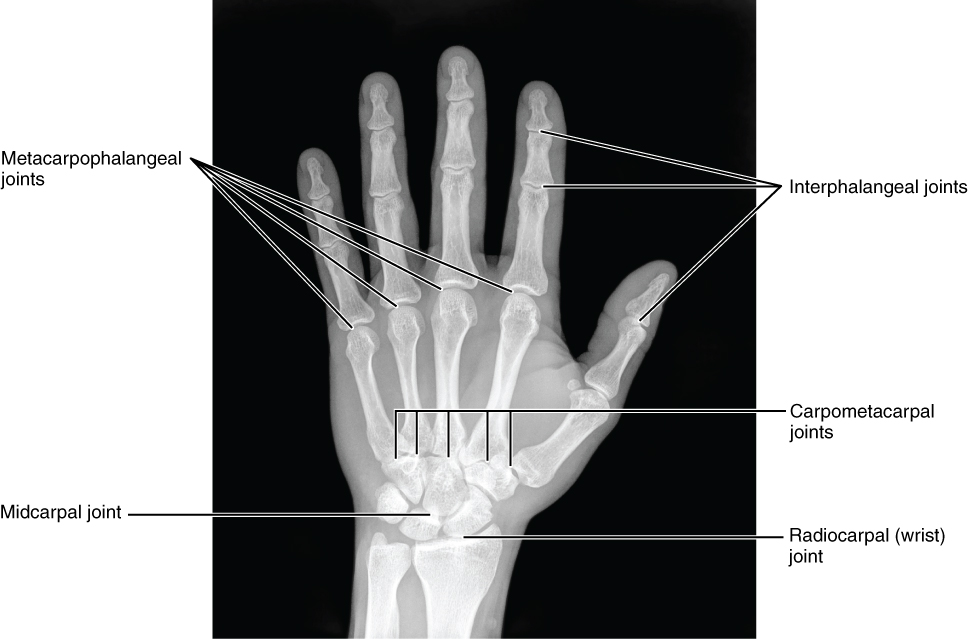
Joints of the hand in an X-ray image

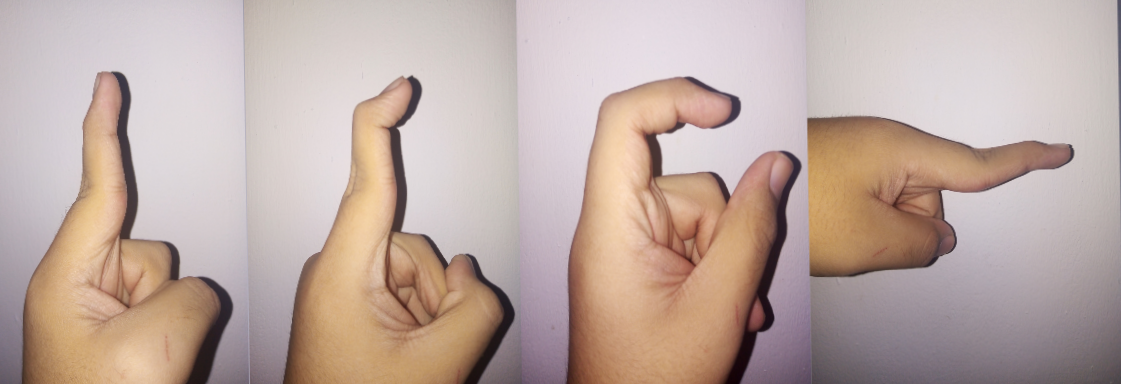
Movement of the three finger phalanges: distal, middle and proximal

== See also ==
- Hand
- Foot
