= Tribonucleation =

Mechanism for creation of microbubbles

Tribonucleation is a mechanism that creates small gas bubbles by the action of making and breaking contact between solid surfaces immersed in a liquid containing dissolved gas. These small bubbles may then act as nuclei for the growth of bubbles when the pressure is reduced. As the formation of the nuclei occurs quite easily, the effect may occur in a human body engaged in light exercise, yet produce no symptoms. However tribonucleation may be a source of growing bubbles affecting scuba divers when ascending to the surface and is a potential cause of decompression sickness. The process has also been described as the basis for the cracking sound produced by the manipulation of human synovial joints.
