= Biaxial joint =

Bodily joint which allows movement in two anatomical planes

In anatomy, a biaxial joint is a freely mobile joint that allows movement in two anatomical planes. An example of a biaxial joint is a metacarpophalangeal joint of the hand. The joint allows for movement along one axis to produce bending or straightening of the finger, and movement along a second axis, which allows for spreading of the fingers away from each other and bringing them together.
