= Ball-and-socket joint =

Ball-shaped surface of one rounded bone fits into the cup-like depression of another bone

Ball and socket joint
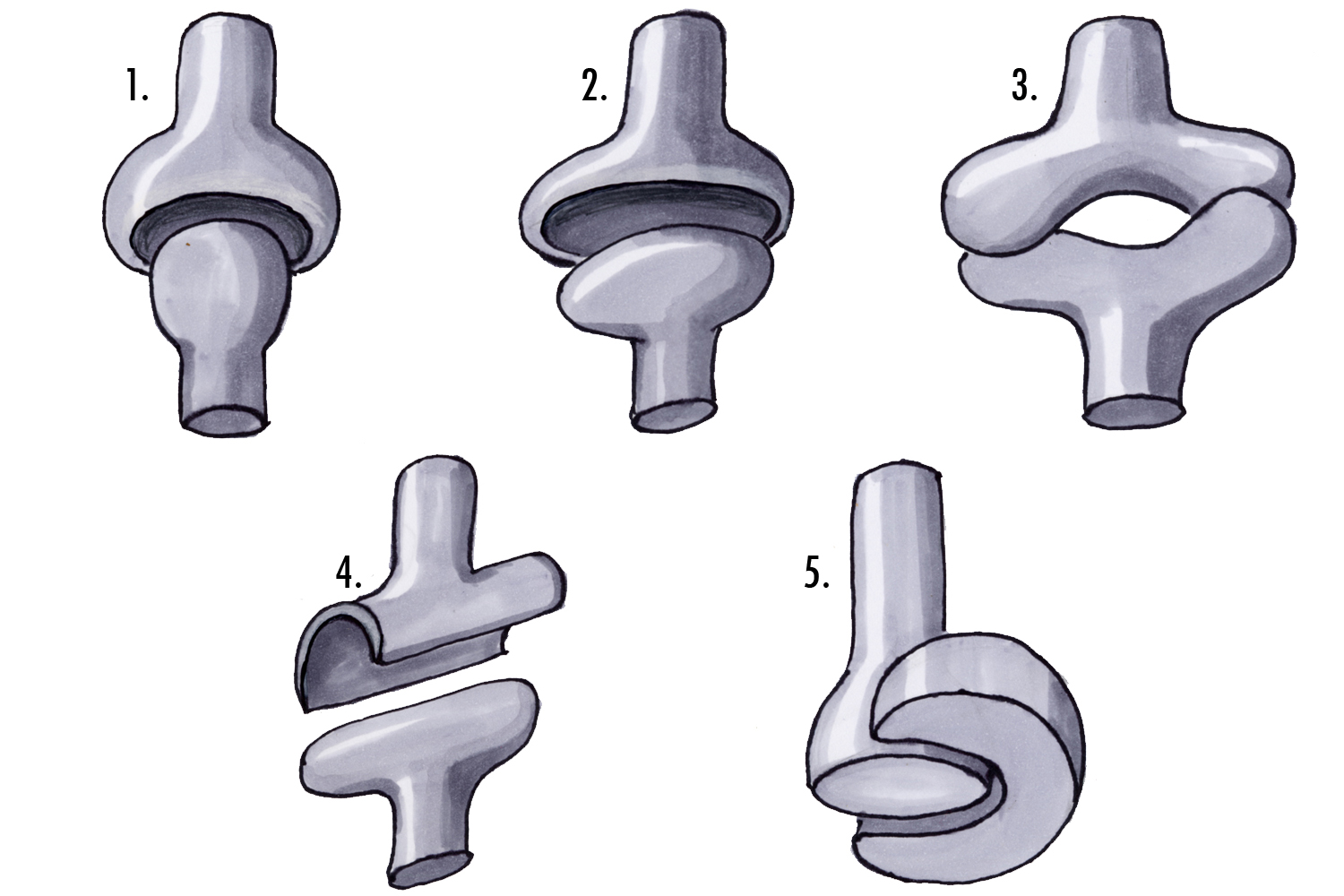
- 1: Ball and socket joint; 2: Condyloid joint (Ellipsoid); 3: Saddle joint; 4 Hinge joint; 5: Pivot joint

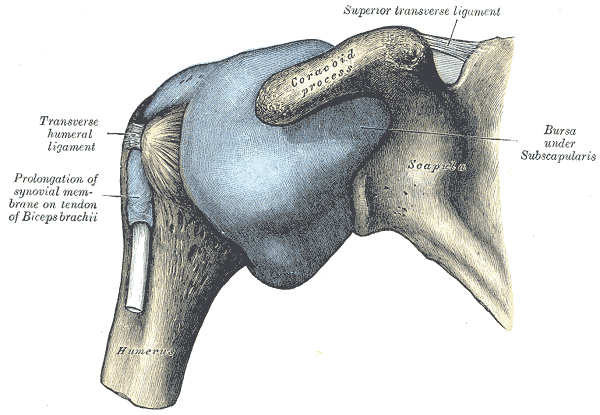
- Capsule of shoulder-joint (distended). Anterior aspect.

Identifiers
- TA98: A03.0.00.050
- TA2: 1562
- FMA: 75301

The ball-and-socket joint (or spheroid joint) is a type of synovial joint in which the ball-shaped surface of one rounded bone fits into the cup-like depression of another bone. The distal bone is capable of motion around an indefinite number of axes, which have one common center. This enables the joint to move in many directions.

An enarthrosis is a special kind of spheroidal joint in which the socket covers the sphere beyond its equator.

== Examples of joints ==
Examples of this form of articulation are found in the hip, where the round head of the femur (ball) rests in the cup-like acetabulum (socket) of the pelvis; and in the shoulder joint, where the rounded upper extremity of the humerus (ball) rests in the cup-like glenoid fossa (socket) of the shoulder blade. (The shoulder also includes a sternoclavicular joint.)

== Ball and Socket Joint Animation ==
Ball and Socket joint animation

== Diagrams ==
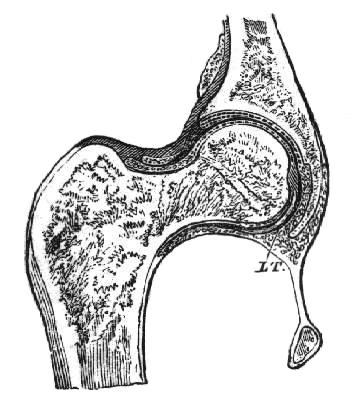
Hip

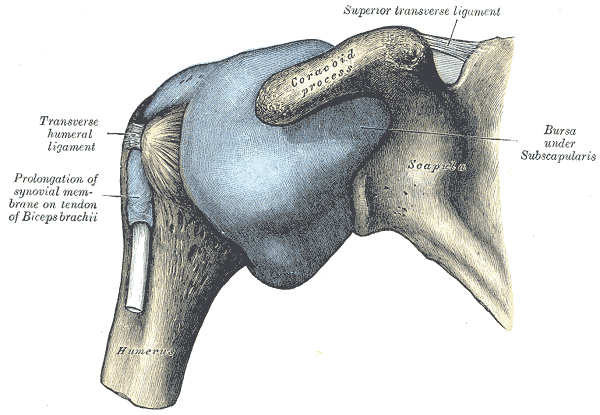
Shoulder

Details of hip joint.
1. Femur
2. Femoral Neck
3. Femoral Head
4. Acetabulum
5. Acetabular labrum
6. Pelvis
