= Joint =

Location at which two or more bones make contact

- Diagram of a typical synovial joint

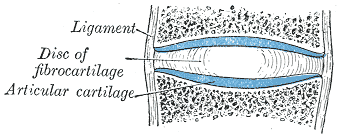
- Depiction of an intervertebral disc, a cartilaginous joint

Details
- System: Musculoskeletal system Articular system

Identifiers
- Latin: articulus, junctura, articulatio
- MeSH: D007596
- TA98: A03.0.00.000
- TA2: 1515
- FMA: 7490

A joint or articulation (or articular surface) is the connection made between bones, ossicles, or other hard structures in the body which link an animal's skeletal system into a functional whole. They are constructed to allow for different degrees and types of movement. Some joints, such as the knee, elbow, and shoulder, are self-lubricating, almost frictionless, and are able to withstand compression and maintain heavy loads while still executing smooth and precise movements. Other joints such as sutures between the bones of the skull permit very little movement (only during birth) in order to protect the brain and the sense organs. The connection between a tooth and the jawbone is also called a joint, and is described as a fibrous joint known as a gomphosis. Joints are classified both structurally and functionally.

Joints play a vital role in the human body, contributing to movement, stability, and overall function. They are essential for mobility and flexibility, connecting bones and facilitating a wide range of motions, from simple bending and stretching to complex actions like running and jumping. Beyond enabling movement, joints provide structural support and stability to the skeleton, helping to maintain posture, balance, and the ability to bear weight during daily activities. They can be aligned in an optimum manner meaning that such functions are performed more efficiently. This is called joint centration. When joints are poorly centrated they are more prone to wear and tear injuries.

The clinical significance of joints is highlighted by common disorders that affect their health and function. Osteoarthritis, a degenerative joint disease, involves the breakdown of cartilage, leading to pain, stiffness, and reduced mobility. Rheumatoid arthritis, an autoimmune disorder, causes chronic inflammation in the joints, often resulting in swelling, pain, and potential deformity. Another prevalent condition, gout, arises from the accumulation of uric acid crystals in the joints, triggering severe pain and inflammation.

Joints also hold diagnostic importance, as their condition can indicate underlying health issues. Symptoms such as joint pain and swelling may signal inflammatory diseases, infections, or metabolic disorders. Effective treatment and management of joint-related conditions often require a multifaceted approach, including physical therapy, medications, lifestyle changes, and, in severe cases, surgical interventions. Preventive care, such as regular exercise, a balanced diet, and avoiding excessive strain, is critical for maintaining joint health, preventing disorders, and improving overall quality of life.

== Classification ==
The number of joints depends on if sesamoids are included, age of the human and the definition of joints. However, the number of sesamoids is the same in most people with variations being rare.

Joints are mainly classified structurally and functionally. Structural classification is determined by how the bones connect to each other, while functional classification is determined by the degree of movement between the articulating bones. In practice, there is significant overlap between the two types of classifications.

=== Clinical, numerical classification ===
- monoarticular – concerning one joint
- oligoarticular or pauciarticular – concerning 2–4 joints
- polyarticular – concerning 5 or more joints

=== Structural classification (binding tissue) ===
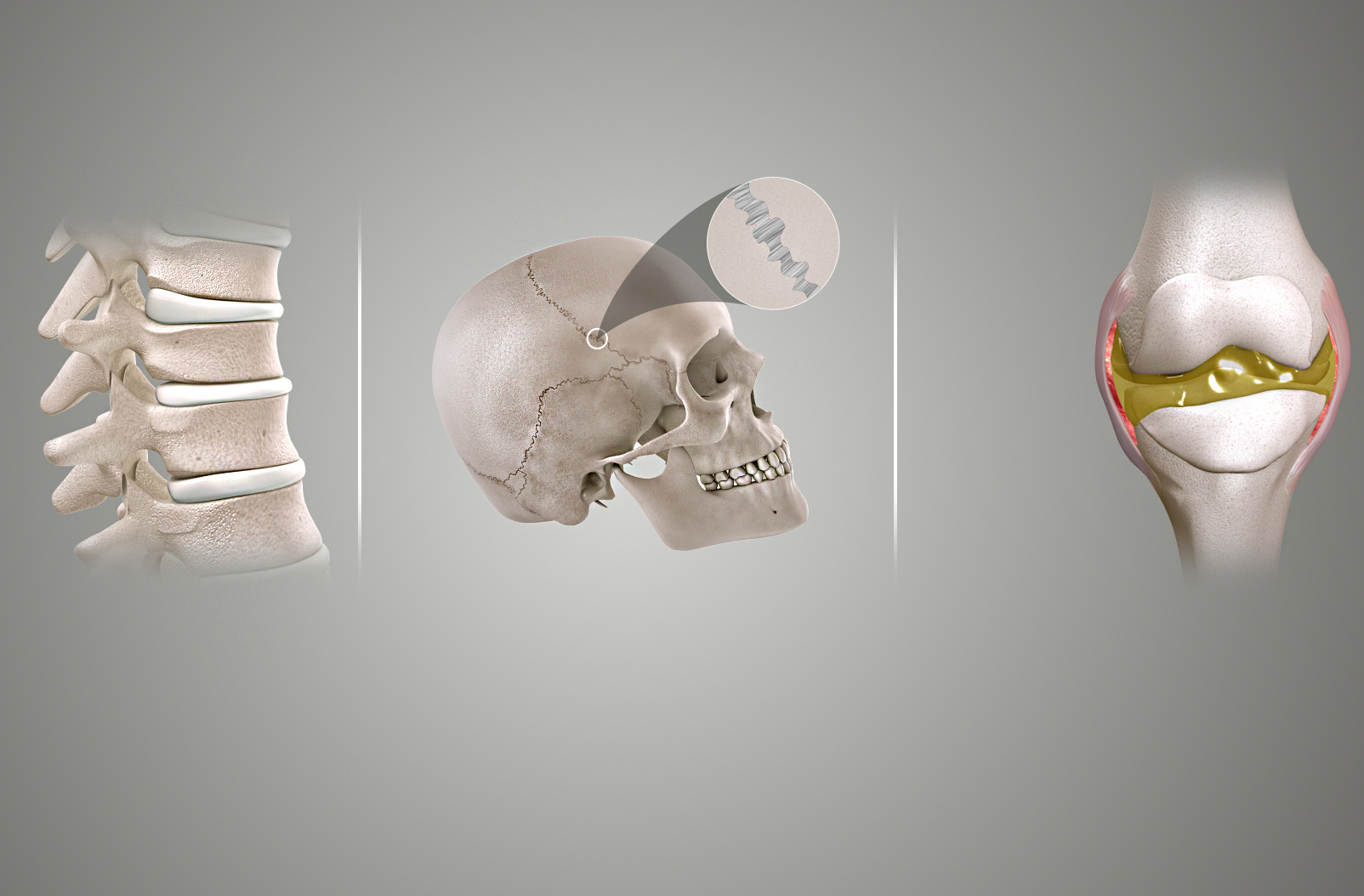
Types of joints based upon their structure (L to R): cartilaginous joint, fibrous joint, and synovial joint.

Structural classification names and divides joints according to the type of binding tissue that connects the bones to each other. There are four structural classifications of joints:

- fibrous joint – joined by dense regular connective tissue that is rich in collagen fibers
- cartilaginous joint – joined by cartilage. There are two types: primary cartilaginous joints composed of hyaline cartilage, and secondary cartilaginous joints composed of hyaline cartilage covering the articular surfaces of the involved bones with fibrocartilage connecting them.
- synovial joint – not directly joined – the bones have a synovial cavity and are united by the dense irregular connective tissue that forms the articular capsule that is normally associated with accessory ligaments.
- facet joint – joint between two articular processes between two vertebrae.

=== Functional classification (movement) ===
Joints can also be classified functionally according to the type and degree of movement they allow: Joint movements are described with reference to the basic anatomical planes.

- synarthrosis – permits little or no mobility. Most synarthrodial joints are fibrous joints, such as skull sutures. This lack of mobility is important, because the skull bones serve to protect the brain.
- amphiarthrosis – permits slight mobility. Most amphiarthrosis joints are cartilaginous joints. An example is the intervertebral disc. Individual intervertebral discs allow for small movements between adjacent vertebrae, but when added together, the vertebral column provides the flexibility that allows the body to twist, or bend to the front, back, or side.
- synovial joint (also known as a diarthrosis) – freely movable. Synovial joints can in turn be classified into six groups according to the type of movement they allow: plane joint, ball and socket joint, hinge joint, pivot joint, condyloid joint and saddle joint.

Joints can also be classified, according to the number of axes of movement they allow, into nonaxial (gliding, as between the proximal ends of the ulna and radius), monoaxial (uniaxial), biaxial and multiaxial. Another classification is according to the degrees of freedom allowed, and distinguished between joints with one, two or three degrees of freedom. A further classification is according to the number and shapes of the articular surfaces: flat, concave and convex surfaces. Types of articular surfaces include trochlear surfaces.

=== Biomechanical classification ===
Joints can also be classified based on their anatomy or on their biomechanical properties. According to the anatomic classification, joints are subdivided into simple and compound, depending on the number of bones involved, and into complex and combination joints:

1. Simple joint: two articulation surfaces (e.g. shoulder joint, hip joint)
2. Compound joint: three or more articulation surfaces (e.g. radiocarpal joint)
3. Complex joint: two or more articulation surfaces and an articular disc or meniscus (e.g. knee joint)

=== Anatomical ===
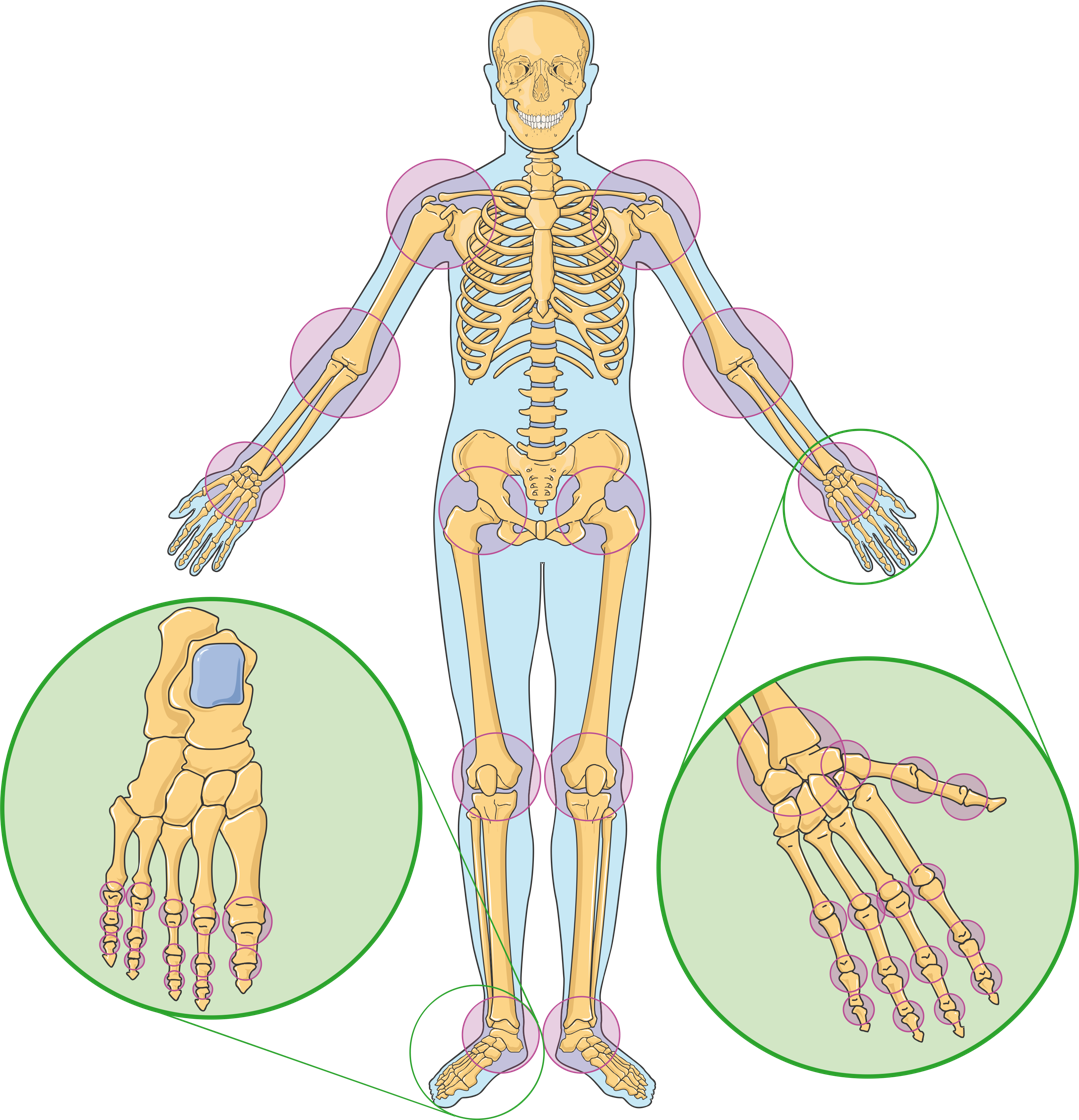
Joints of the human body

The joints may be classified anatomically into the following groups:

1. Joints of hand
2. Elbow joints
3. Wrist joints
4. Axillary joints
5. Sternoclavicular joints
6. Vertebral articulations
7. Temporomandibular joints
8. Sacroiliac joints
9. Hip joints
10. Knee joints
11. Articulations of foot

Unmyelinated nerve fibers are abundant in joint capsules and ligaments, as well as in the outer part of intra-articular menisci. These nerve fibers are responsible for pain perception when a joint is strained.

== Clinical significance ==
Damaging the cartilage of joints (articular cartilage) or the bones and muscles that stabilize the joints can lead to joint dislocations and osteoarthritis. Swimming is a great way to exercise the joints with minimal damage. Another potential intervention is the oral supplementation of type II collagen, glucosamine hydrochloride, and chondroitin sulfate improving the quality of life.

A joint disorder is termed arthropathy, and when involving inflammation of one or more joints the disorder is called arthritis. Most joint disorders involve arthritis, but joint damage by external physical trauma is typically not termed arthritis.

Arthropathies are called polyarticular (multiarticular) when involving many joints and monoarticular when involving only a single joint.

Arthritis is the leading cause of disability in people over the age of 55. There are many different forms of arthritis, each of which has a different cause. The most common form of arthritis, osteoarthritis (also known as degenerative joint disease), occurs following trauma to the joint, following an infection of the joint or simply as a result of aging and the deterioration of articular cartilage. Furthermore, there is emerging evidence that abnormal anatomy may contribute to early development of osteoarthritis. Other forms of arthritis are rheumatoid arthritis and psoriatic arthritis, which are autoimmune diseases in which the body is attacking itself. Septic arthritis is caused by joint infection. Gouty arthritis is caused by deposition of uric acid crystals in the joint that results in subsequent inflammation. Additionally, there is a less common form of gout that is caused by the formation of rhomboidal-shaped crystals of calcium pyrophosphate. This form of gout is known as pseudogout.

Temporomandibular joint syndrome (TMJ) involves the jaw joints and can cause facial pain, clicking sounds in the jaw, or limitation of jaw movement, to name a few symptoms. It is caused by psychological tension and misalignment of the jaw (malocclusion), and may be affecting as many as 75 million Americans.

== Body language ==
The joints and their respective positions, alignments and movements are of fundamental importance to the study of emotional body language i.e. that which is representative of different emotional states. The range of movement of the joints is known as joint amplitude and, for the spine specifically, spinal amplitude. They are key indicators of the emotional state that a person is in and how they are reacting on an emotional basis to social interactions. For example, during walking a person's hip and shoulder flexion is significantly greater when they are angry than when they are sad. Similarly, trunk rotation is significantly increased when a person is in a joyful mood relative to a neutral one.

== History ==
=== Etymology ===
The English word joint is a past participle of the verb join, and can be read as joined. Joint is derived from Latin iunctus, past participle of the Latin verb iungere, join, unite, connect, attach.

The English term articulation is derived from Latin articulatio.

Humans have also developed lighter, more fragile joint bones over time due to the decrease in physical activity compared to thousands of years ago.

== See also ==
- Arthrology
- Cracking joints
- Kinesiology
- Ligament
- Development of joints
