= List of movements of the human body =

The different types of levers in the human body. These levers consisting of First Class Lever, Second Class Lever, and a Third Class Lever.

The list below describes such skeletal movements as normally are possible in particular joints of the human body. Other animals have different degrees of movement at their respective joints; this is because of differences in positions of muscles and because structures peculiar to the bodies of humans and other species block motions unsuited to their anatomies.

== Arm and shoulder ==
=== Shoulder ===
Movements of the shoulder joint.
Movement	Muscles	Origin	Insertion
Flexion (150°–170°)	Anterior fibers of deltoid	Clavicle	Middle of lateral surface of shaft of humerus
Flexion (150°–170°)	Clavicular part of pectoralis major	Clavicle	Lateral lip of bicipital groove of humerus
Flexion (150°–170°)	Long head of biceps brachii	Supraglenoid tubercle of scapula	Tuberosity of radius, Deep fascia of forearm
Flexion (150°–170°)	Short head of biceps brachii	Coracoid process of scapula	Tuberosity of radius, Deep fascia of forearm
Flexion (150°–170°)	Coracobrachialis	Coracoid process	Medial aspect of shaft of humerus
Extension (40°)	Posterior fibers of deltoid	Spine of scapula	Middle of lateral surface of shaft of humerus
Extension (40°)	Latissimus dorsi	Iliac crest, lumbar fascia, spines of lower six thoracic vertebrae, lower 3–4 ribs, inferior angle of scapula	Floor of bicipital groove of humerus
Extension (40°)	Teres major	Lateral border of scapula	Medial lip of bicipital groove of humerus
Abduction (160°–180°)	Middle fibers of deltoid	Acromion process of scapula	Middle of lateral surface of shaft of humerus
Abduction (160°–180°)	Supraspinatus	Supraspinous fossa of scapula	Greater tubercle of humerus
Adduction (30°–40°)	Sternal part of pectoralis major	Sternum, upper six costal cartilages	Lateral lip of bicipital groove of humerus
Adduction (30°–40°)	Latissimus dorsi	Iliac crest, lumbar fascia, spines of lower six thoracic vertebrae, lower 3-4 ribs, inferior angle of scapula	Floor of bicipital groove of humerus
Adduction (30°–40°)	Teres major	Lower third of lateral border of scapula	Medial lip of bicipital groove of humerus
Adduction (30°–40°)	Teres minor	Upper two thirds of lateral border of scapula	Greater tubercle of humerus
Lateral rotation (in abduction: 95°; in adduction: 70°)	Infraspinatus	Infraspinous fossa of scapula	Greater tubercle of humerus
Lateral rotation (in abduction: 95°; in adduction: 70°)	Teres minor	Upper two thirds of lateral border of scapula	Greater tubercle of humerus
Lateral rotation (in abduction: 95°; in adduction: 70°)	Posterior fibers of deltoid	Spine of scapula	Middle of lateral surface of shaft of humerus
Medial rotation (in abduction: 40°–50°; in adduction: 70°)	Subscapularis	Subscapular fossa	Lesser tubercle of humerus
Medial rotation (in abduction: 40°–50°; in adduction: 70°)	Latissimus dorsi	Iliac crest, lumbar fascia, spines of lower 3-4 ribs, inferior angle of scapula	Floor of bicipital groove of humerus
Medial rotation (in abduction: 40°–50°; in adduction: 70°)	Teres major	Lower third of lateral border of scapula	Medial lip of bicipital groove of humerus
Medial rotation (in abduction: 40°–50°; in adduction: 70°)	Anterior fibers of deltoid	Clavicle	Middle of lateral surface of shaft of humerus

The major muscles involved in retraction include the rhomboid major muscle, rhomboid minor muscle and trapezius muscle, whereas the major muscles involved in protraction include the serratus anterior and pectoralis minor muscles.

=== Sternoclavicular and acromioclavicular joints ===
Scapula and clavicula	Abduction (Protraction)	Adduction (Retraction)
	Depression	Elevation
	Rotation Upward (Superior Rotation)	Rotation Downward (Inferior Rotation)

=== Elbow ===
Joint	From	To	Description
Humeroulnar joint	trochlear notch of the ulna	trochlea of humerus	Is a simple hinge-joint, and allows of movements of flexion and extension only.
Humeroradial joint	head of the radius	capitulum of the humerus	Is a ball-and-socket joint.
Superior radioulnar joint	head of the radius	radial notch of the ulna	In any position of flexion or extension, the radius, carrying the hand with it, can be rotated in it. This movement includes pronation and supination.

=== Wrist and fingers ===
Wrist & Midcarpals	Flexion	Extension / Hyperextension
	Adduction (Ulna Deviation)	Abduction (Radial Deviation)

==== Movements of the fingers ====
Metacarpophalangeal	Flexion	Extension / Hyperextension
	Adduction	Abduction
Interphalangeal	Flexion	Extension

==== Movements of the thumb ====
Carpometacarpal (thumb)	Flexion	Extension
	Adduction	Abduction
	Opposition	
Metacarpophalangeal (thumb)	Flexion	Extension
	Adduction	Abduction
Interphalangeal (thumb)	Flexion	Extension / Hyperextension

== Neck ==
Neck (Atlantoccipital & Antlantoaxial)	Flexion	Extension / Hyperextension
	Lateral Flexion (Abduction)	Reduction (Adduction)
	Rotation	

== Spine ==
Cervical spine	Flexion	Extension / Hyperextension
	Lateral Flexion (Abduction)	Reduction (Adduction)
	Rotation	
Thoracic spine	Flexion	Extension / Hyperextension
	Lateral Flexion (Abduction)	Reduction (Adduction)
	Rotation	
Lumbar spine	Flexion	Extension / Hyperextension
	Lateral Flexion (Abduction)	Reduction (Adduction)
	Rotation	

== Lower limb ==
Hip (acetabulofemoral joint)	Flexion	Extension
	Adduction	Abduction
	Transverse Adduction	Transverse Abduction
	Medial Rotation (Internal Rotation)	Lateral Rotation (External Rotation)

=== Knees ===
Knee	Flexion	Extension
	Medial Rotation (Internal Rotation)	Lateral Rotation (External Rotation)

Ankle	Plantar Flexion	Dorsi Flexion

=== Feet ===
Intertarsal - (foot)	Inversion	Eversion
	Plantarflexion	

Metatarsophalangeal (toes)	Flexion	Extension / Hyperextension
	Abduction	Adduction

Interphalangeal (toes)	Flexion	Extension

The muscles tibialis anterior and tibialis posterior invert the foot. Some sources also state that the triceps surae and extensor hallucis longus invert. Inversion occurs at the subtalar joint and transverse tarsal joint.

Eversion of the foot occurs at the subtalar joint. The muscles involved in this include fibularis longus and fibularis brevis, which are innervated by the superficial fibular nerve. Some sources also state that the fibularis tertius everts.

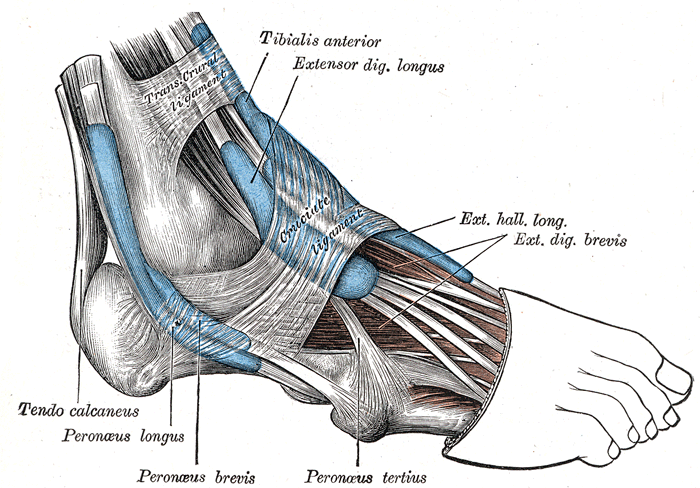
Peroneus longus and peroneus brevis (centre left), the primary muscles involved in eversion

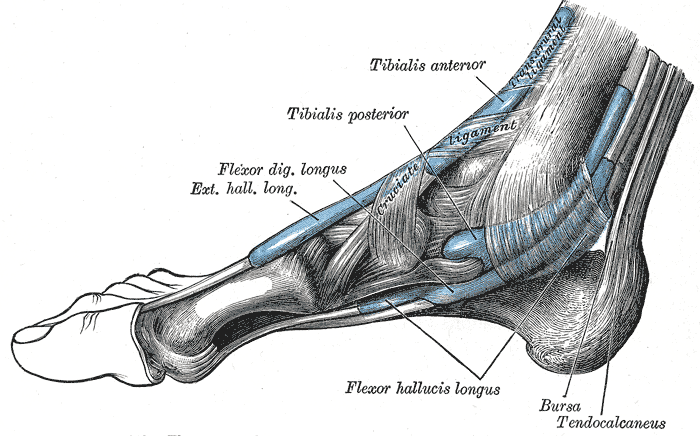
Tibialis anterior and posterior (centre top), the primary muscles involved in inversion

Dorsiflexion of the foot: The muscles involved include those of the Anterior compartment of leg, specifically tibialis anterior muscle, extensor hallucis longus muscle, extensor digitorum longus muscle, and peroneus tertius. The range of motion for dorsiflexion indicated in the literature varies from 12.2 to 18 degrees. Foot drop is a condition, that occurs when dorsiflexion is difficult for an individual who is walking.

Plantarflexion of the foot: Primary muscles for plantar flexion are situated in the Posterior compartment of leg, namely the superficial Gastrocnemius, Soleus and Plantaris (only weak participation), and the deep muscles Flexor hallucis longus, Flexor digitorum longus and Tibialis posterior. Muscles in the Lateral compartment of leg also weakly participate, namely the Fibularis longus and Fibularis brevis muscles. Those in the lateral compartment only have weak participation in plantar flexion though. The range of motion for plantar flexion is usually indicated in the literature as 30° to 40°, but sometimes also 50°. The nerves are primarily from the sacral spinal cord roots S1 and S2. Compression of S1 roots may result in weakness in plantarflexion; these nerves run from the lower back to the bottom of the foot.

Pronation at the forearm is a rotational movement at the radioulnar joint, or of the foot at the subtalar and talocalcaneonavicular joints. For the forearm, when standing in the anatomical position, pronation will move the palm of the hand from an anterior-facing position to a posterior-facing position without an associated movement at the shoulder joint). This corresponds to a counterclockwise twist for the right forearm and a clockwise twist for the left (when viewed superiorly). In the forearm, this action is performed by pronator quadratus and pronator teres muscle. Brachioradialis puts the forearm into a midpronated/supinated position from either full pronation or supination. For the foot, pronation will cause the sole of the foot to face more laterally than when standing in the anatomical position.

Pronation of the foot is a compound movement that combines abduction, eversion, and dorsiflexion. Regarding posture, a pronated foot is one in which the heel bone angles inward and the arch tends to collapse. Pronation is the motion of the inner and outer ball of the foot with the heel bone. One is said to be "knock-kneed" if one has overly pronated feet. It flattens the arch as the foot strikes the ground in order to absorb shock when the heel hits the ground, and to assist in balance during mid-stance. If habits develop, this action can lead to foot pain as well as knee pain, shin splints, achilles tendinitis, posterior tibial tendinitis, piriformis syndrome, and plantar fasciitis..
