= Humeroradial joint =

Joint of the elbow

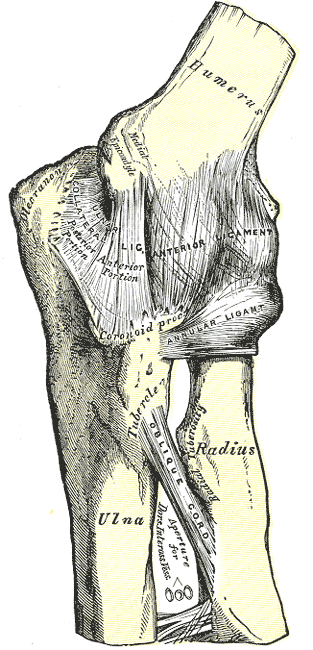
- Left elbow-joint, showing anterior and ulnar collateral ligaments

Details

Identifiers
- Latin: articulatio humeroradialis
- TA98: A03.5.09.003
- TA2: 1774
- FMA: 38855

The humeroradial joint is the joint between the head of the radius and the capitulum of the humerus, is a limited ball-and-socket joint, hinge type of synovial joint.

== Structure ==
The annular ligament binds the head of the radius to the radial notch of the ulna, preventing any separation of the two bones laterally. Therefore, the humeroradial joint is not functionally a ball and socket joint, although the joint surface in itself allows movement in all directions.

The annular ligament secures the head of the radius from dislocation, which would otherwise tend to occur, from the shallowness of the cup-like surface on the head of the radius. Without this ligament, the tendon of the biceps brachii would be liable to pull the head of the radius out of the joint.

The head of the radius is not in complete contact with the capitulum of the humerus in all positions of the joint.

The capitulum occupies only the anterior and inferior surfaces of the lower end of the humerus, so that in complete extension a part of the radial head can be plainly felt projecting at the back of the joint.

In full flexion the movement of the radial head is hampered by the compression of the surrounding soft parts, so that the freest rotatory movement of the radius on the humerus (pronation and supination) takes place in semiflexion, in which position the two articular surfaces are in most intimate contact.

Flexion and extension of the elbow-joint are limited by the tension of the structures on the front and back of the joint; the limitation of flexion is also aided by the soft structures of the arm and forearm coming into contact.

== Clinical significance ==
=== Subluxation ===
A subluxation of the humeroradial joint is called a "nursemaid's elbow", also known as radial head subluxation. It is generally caused by a sudden pull on the extended pronated forearm, such as by an adult tugging on an uncooperative child or by swinging the child by the arms during play.

In radial head subluxation, there is little complaint of pain, and the person generally reports pain in the proximal forearm. The mechanism is slippage of the head of the radius under the annular ligament. The distal attachment of the annular ligament covering the radial head is weaker in children than in adults, allowing it to be more easily torn. The older child will usually point to the dorsal aspect of the proximal forearm when asked where it hurts. This may mislead one to suspect a buckle fracture of the proximal radius. There is no tear in the soft tissue (probably due to the pliability of young connective tissues).

=== Dislocation ===
A radial head dislocation is mainly caused by trauma, or by a congenital state. The traumatic form is usually seen in infancy and childhood as an isolated injury.

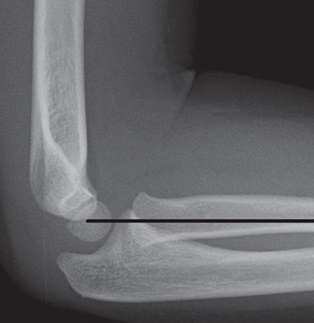
The radiocapitellar line is used in the detection of radial head dislocation on lateral X-rays. It normally goes through the capitulum of the humerus.

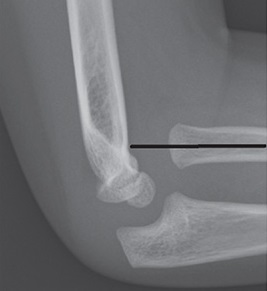
Abnormally pointed radiocapitellar line, indicating radial head dislocation.

== Additional images ==
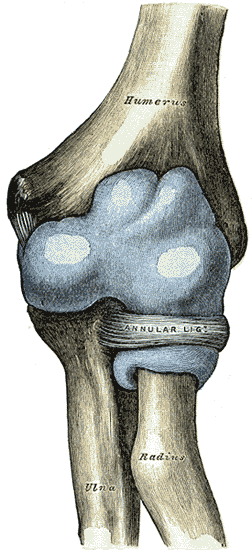
Capsule of elbow-joint (distended) seen from front

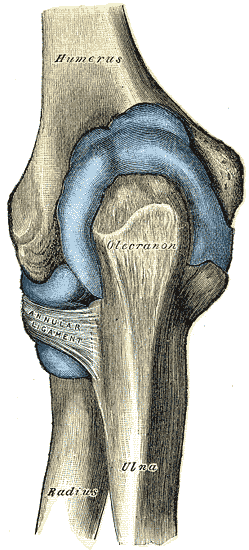
Capsule of elbow-joint (distended) seen from back

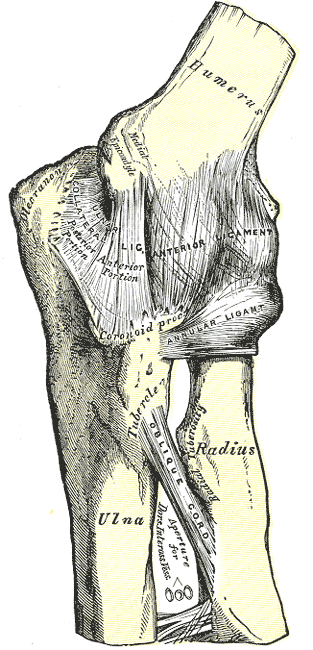
Left elbow-joint showing anterior and ulnar collateral ligaments

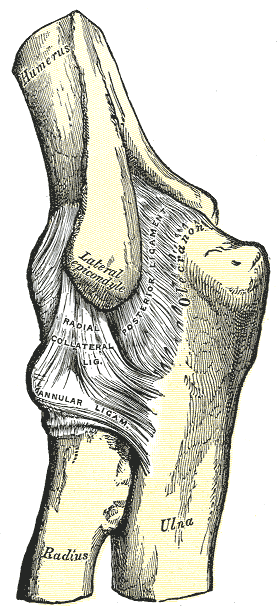
Left elbow-joint showing posterior and radial collateral ligaments

== See also ==
- Elbow
- Humeroulnar joint
