= Elbow pain =

Discomfort at the elbow region

Elbow pain generally refers to discomfort in the joint (elbow) between the upper arm and forearm. Elbow pain is a common complaint in both the emergency department and in primary care offices. The CDC estimated that 1.15 million people visited an emergency room for elbow or forearm-related injuries in 2020. There are many possible causes of elbow discomfort but the most common are trauma, infection, and inflammation. Pain may be acute, chronic or associated with a number of other symptoms (e.g. swelling, bleeding, numbness, tingling, lack of mobility). Treatments range from conservative measures, such as ice and rest, to surgical interventions, depending on the underlying cause and severity.

== Causes ==
Elbow pain can result from a number of conditions. On a cellular level the pain, a.k.a. nociception, is conveyed through nerves in the elbow. Theses nerve cells, a.k.a. neurons, are activated and or compressed due to local tissue damage and swelling, which ultimately leads to pain and possibly numbness (see nerve entrapment).

Trauma is a common cause of this local tissue damage. Traumatic events such as car accidents, falls, or assaults to this area can result in fractures and dislocations of the bones surrounding the elbow. In children, there is a specific type of dislocation called a pulled elbow or subluxation seen when an extended elbow is pulled with force. Frequently, these traumas can cause obvious deformities visible to the naked eye, but other times more advanced imaging (i.e. x-ray, CT, or MRI) is required to evaluate the extent of the damage.

When pain is not associated with a specific incident a more general type of inflammation may be involved. This broad category is best thought of in terms of how long pain symptoms have been present. If pain is acute or subacute, there is a greater concern for over-use injuries or infection. Repetitive strain injury is defined as inflammation of tendons from forceful, repetitive motions. This is common with jobs that require manual labor, and with sports and other recreational activities. Based on the mechanics of the repetitive motion, pain will be located in different locations on the elbow. Pain on the inside of the elbow is known as golfer's elbow, while pain on the outside is known as tennis elbow. There are multiple types of infections that can result in elbow pain. A frequent presentation is known as arthralgias or body aches. This is a generalized joint pain that can be a non-specific symptom associate with almost any minor viral or bacterial illness. It is also possible to have a local skin and soft tissue infection, known as cellulitis, in the structures that overly the elbow resulting in pain. When the infection affects deeper structures such as the joint or bursa, then a more serious diagnosis of bursitis or septic arthritis is made. Finally, reactive arthritis is a joint pain resulting from an overactive immune response in the days to weeks following a bacterial infection.

When pain is more chronic, there is a higher concern for arthritic and autoimmune conditions. Both are more common in middle-aged to older adults. Osteoarthritis is caused by normal wear-and-tear of the joints and worsened by extreme forces or injury, whereas autoimmune conditions, like rheumatoid arthritis, are caused by the body's own defenses attacking joint tissues. Autoimmune conditions typically have other associated symptoms like rash, weight-loss, fatigue, swelling, and low-grade fever. Furthermore, autoimmune pain is typically described as morning stiffness whereas osteoarthritic pain is usually described as end-of-day soreness.

There are many potential rare and uncommon causes of a non-specific symptom like elbow pain. If associated with weight loss, bone pain, or an enlarging mass there is concern for a bone tumor. If there is a family history of iron overload or diseases of erythropoiesis, one could consider hemochromatosis. More generally, congenital malformations, normal anatomy variations or medication side-effects could also be contributing. Without a more specific complaint a physician would require a more detailed history, a complete physical exam, and possibly more advanced labs and imaging before a diagnosis could be made.

Red flag symptoms point to a serious underlying cause. For elbow pain, these include:

1. History of elbow trauma
2. Swollen or red joint plus system signs of infection (i.e. fever, chills, fatigue)
3. Rapidly increased swelling or mass

== Management ==
There are many preventative steps an individual can take to avoid elbow pain. Reducing specific risk factors like wearing appropriate safety equipment (e.g. safety belts, vibration limiters, or loading machines), limiting repetitive movements, using good ergonomics, and taking breaks all work to limit overuse and accidental injuries in the workplace and during recreational activities.

Orthopedic doctors recommend treating musculoskeletal pain with a multimodal approach for highest efficacy. For mild pain (i.e. minor trauma, tendinopathies, osteoarthritis) there are many conservative or at-home treatments available to patients. General recommendations include elevating the joint, intermittent icing, and physical exercises (i.e. physical therapy, stretching, etc.). When considering medications, they recommend using the lowest possible dose to effectively treat pain. Nonsteroidal anti-inflammatory drugs (NSAIDs) such as ibuprofen and acetaminophen are a common household starting point, with more severe pain requiring a possible escalation to opioid medication. Dosage and duration of this medication should be limited.

For more serious elbow pathologies, formal diagnosis by a medical professional will determine final management plans. For example, traumas, dislocations, and tendon ruptures may require reduction or other surgery. Various antibiotics can be used to manage cellulitis and septic arthritis depending on the causative organism, and autoimmune conditions can benefit from immunomodulators or steroid injections.
