= Posterior ligament of elbow =

Ligament of the elbow

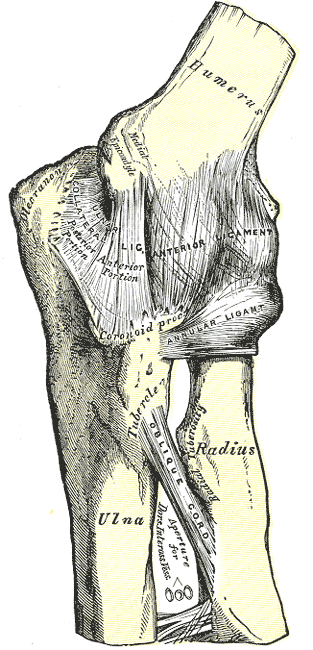
- Left elbow-joint, showing anterior and ulnar collateral ligaments.

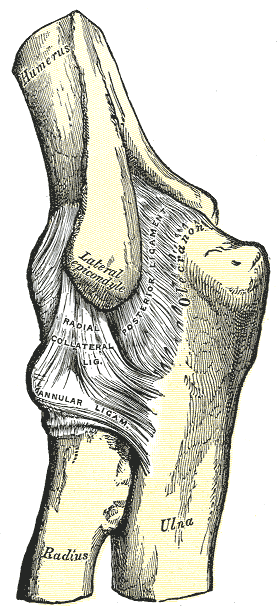
- Left elbow-joint, showing posterior and radial collateral ligaments.

The posterior ligament is thin and membranous, and consists of transverse and oblique fibers.

Above, it is attached to the humerus immediately behind the capitulum and close to the medial margin of the trochlea, to the margins of the olecranon fossa, and to the back of the lateral epicondyle some little distance from the trochlea.

Below, it is fixed to the upper and lateral margins of the olecranon, to the posterior part of the annular ligament, and to the ulna behind the radial notch.

The transverse fibers form a strong band which bridges across the olecranon fossa; under cover of this band a pouch of synovial membrane and a pad of fat project into the upper part of the fossa when the joint is extended.

In the fat are a few scattered fibrous bundles, which pass from the deep surface of the transverse band to the upper part of the fossa.

This ligament is in relation, behind, with the tendon of the Triceps brachii and the Anconæus.
