= Radial collateral ligament of elbow joint =

Ligament of elbow

Radial collateral ligament
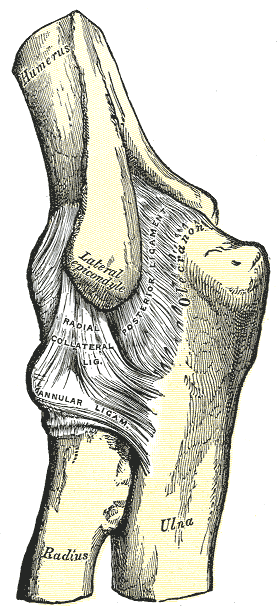
- Left elbow joint, showing posterior and radial collateral ligaments. (Radial collateral ligament visible near center.)

Details
- From: Lateral epicondyle
- To: Annular ligament

Identifiers
- Latin: ligamentum collaterale radiale
- TA98: A03.5.09.006
- TA2: 1777
- FMA: 38866

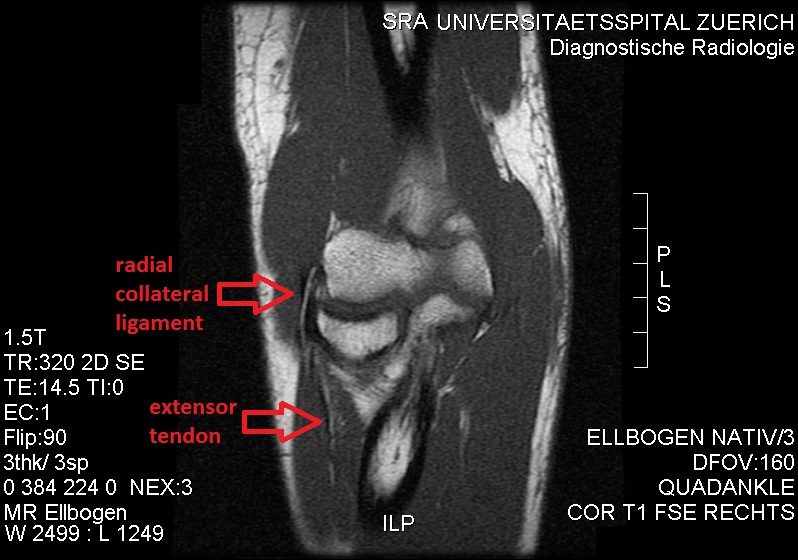
MRI of the elbow (T1 weighted) showing an unimpaired radial collateral ligament and extensor tendon.

The radial collateral ligament (RCL), lateral collateral ligament (LCL), or external lateral ligament (Note: As opposed to the "internal lateral ligament", better known as the medial or ulnar collateral ligament) is a ligament in the elbow on the side of the radius.

== Structure ==
The composition of the triangular ligamentous structure on the lateral side of the elbow varies widely between individuals and can be considered either a single ligament, in which case multiple distal attachments are generally mentioned and the annular ligament is described separately, or as several separate ligaments, in which case parts of those ligaments are often described as indistinguishable from each other.

In the latter case, the ligaments are collectively referred to as the lateral collateral ligament complex (LCLC), consisting of four ligaments:

- the radial collateral ligament [proper] (RCL), from the lateral epicondyle to the annular ligament deep to the common extensor tendon
- the lateral ulnar collateral ligament (LUCL), from the lateral epicondyle to the supinator crest on the ulna. Near the attachment on the humerus this ligament is normally indistinguishable from the RCL and can be considered the posterior portion of it. Martin 1958 described the distal part of the LUCL as "a definite bundle which normally crosses the annular band and gains attachment to the supinator crest, frequently to a special tubercle on that crest" but didn't name it.
- the annular ligament (AL), from the posterior to the anterior margins of radial notch on the ulna, encircles the head of radius and holds it against the radial notch of ulna.
- the accessory lateral collateral ligament (ALCL), from the inferior margin of the annular ligament to the supinator crest.

== Clinical significance ==
The radial collateral ligament may be involved in lateral epicondylitis.

== Additional images ==
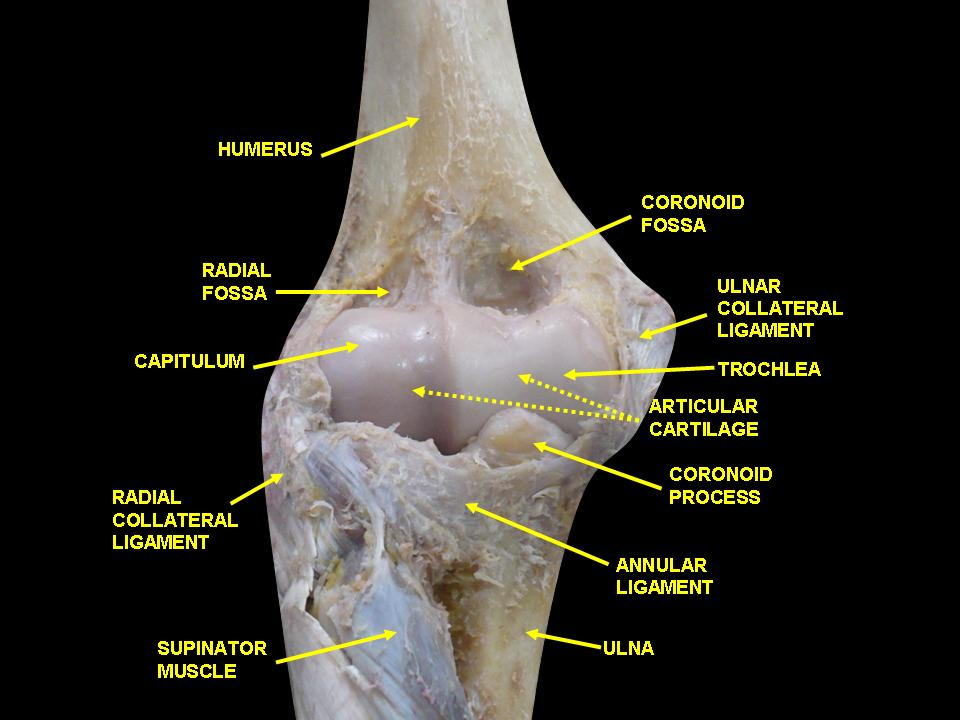
Elbow joint. Deep dissection. Anterior view.

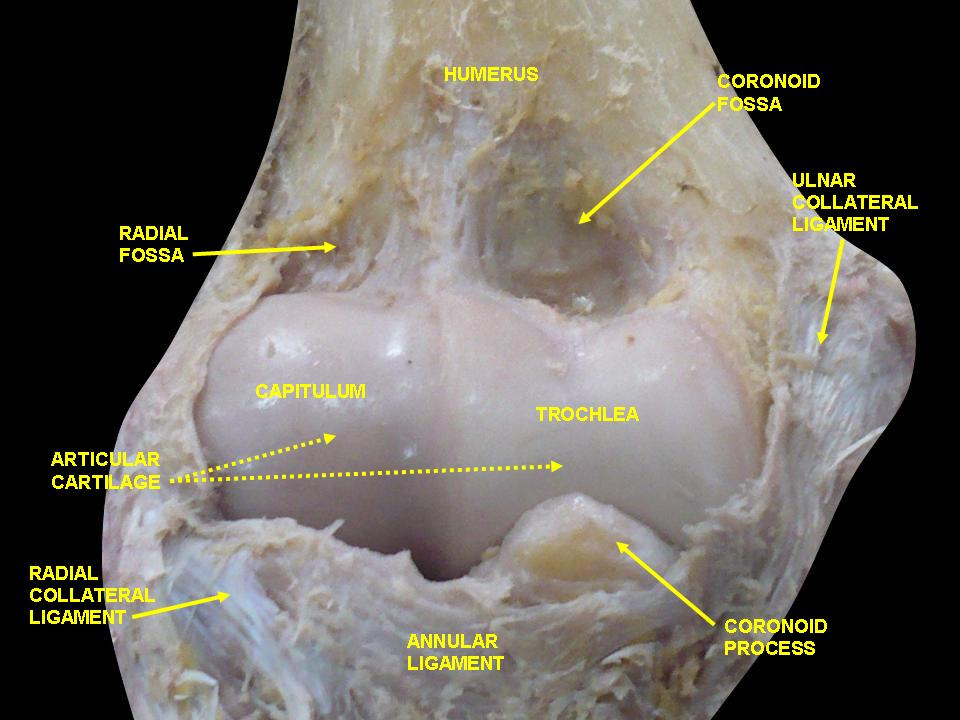
Elbow joint. Deep dissection. Anterior view.
