= Anterior ligament of elbow =

Ligament of the elbow

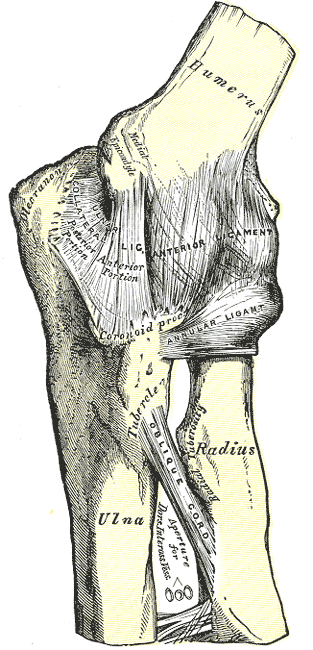
- Left elbow-joint, showing anterior and ulnar collateral ligaments.

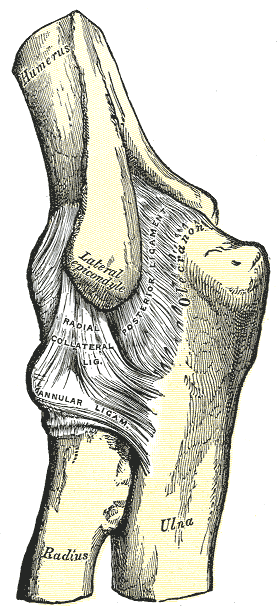
- Left elbow-joint, showing posterior and radial collateral ligaments.

The anterior ligament of the elbow is a broad and thin fibrous layer covering the anterior surface of the joint.

It is attached to the front of the medial epicondyle and to the front of the humerus immediately above the coronoid and radial fossae below, to the anterior surface of the coronoid process of the ulna and to the annular ligament, being continuous on either side with the collateral ligaments.

Its superficial fibers pass obliquely from the medial epicondyle of the humerus to the annular ligament.

The middle fibers, vertical in direction, pass from the upper part of the coronoid fossa and become partly blended with the preceding, but are inserted mainly into the anterior surface of the coronoid process.

The deep or transverse set intersects these at right angles. This ligament is in relation, in front, with the brachialis muscle, except at its most lateral part.
