= Collateral ligament of elbow joint =

Collateral ligament of elbow joint may refer to:

- Ulnar collateral ligament of elbow joint
- Radial collateral ligament of elbow joint
