= Quadrate ligament =

Ligament of the forearm

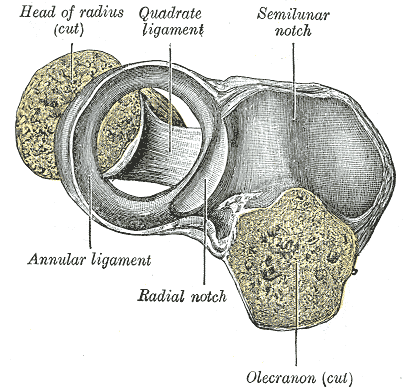
- Proximal radioulnar joint viewed from above. Quadrate ligament is seen attached to the dislodged radius cut just above the neck.

Details

Identifiers
- Latin: ligamentum quadratum
- TA98: A03.5.09.008
- TA2: 1779
- FMA: 38900

In human anatomy, the quadrate ligament or ligament of Denucé is one of the ligaments of the proximal radioulnar joint in the upper forearm.

== Structure ==
The quadrate ligament is a fibrous band attached to the inferior border of the radial notch on the ulna and to the neck of the radius. Its borders are strengthened by fibers from the upper border of the annular ligament. The ligament is 11 mm (0.43 in) long, 8 mm (0.31 in) wide, and 1 mm (0.039 in) thick.

== Function ==
The quadrate ligament reinforces the inferior part of the capsule of the elbow joint and contributes to joint stability by securing the proximal radius against the radial notch and by restricting excessive supination (10–20° restriction) and, to a lesser degree, pronation (5–8°).

== History ==
The quadrate ligament was first described by the French anatomist Jean-Paul-Louis Denucé in 1854, but its function and even presence has been disputed in anatomical literature ever since.

It received little attention before Nomina Anatomica Parisiensia recognized it as a functional structure in 1955. Martin 1958, nevertheless, found no evidence of the ligament, and described it as "nothing more than a thin fibrous layer" of the joint capsule — somewhat in line with Denucé's note that the ligament could be considered a simple extension of the synovial recess or an extension of the annular ligament.

Spinner & Kaplan 1970, on the other hand, described the ligament as having an anterior border denser and stronger than the posterior, with a thin central portion. This description was, however, not corroborated by Tubbs et al. 2006 who, while recognizing the ligament's importance, found it to be of even thickness.
