= Radioulnar articulation =

Radioulnar articulation may refer to:

- Distal radioulnar articulation
- Proximal radioulnar articulation
