= Posterior ligament =

The Posterior ligament may refer to:

- Posterior sacroiliac ligament
- Posterior ligament of the head of the fibula
- Posterior ligament of the lateral malleolus
- Oblique popliteal ligament
- Posterior ligament of elbow
