= Anterior ligament =

Anterior ligament may refer to:

- Anterior ligament of malleus
- Anterior ligament of the head of the fibula
- Anterior ligament of the lateral malleolus
- Anterior ligament of elbow
