= Radial fossa =

Groove on the distal end of the humerus

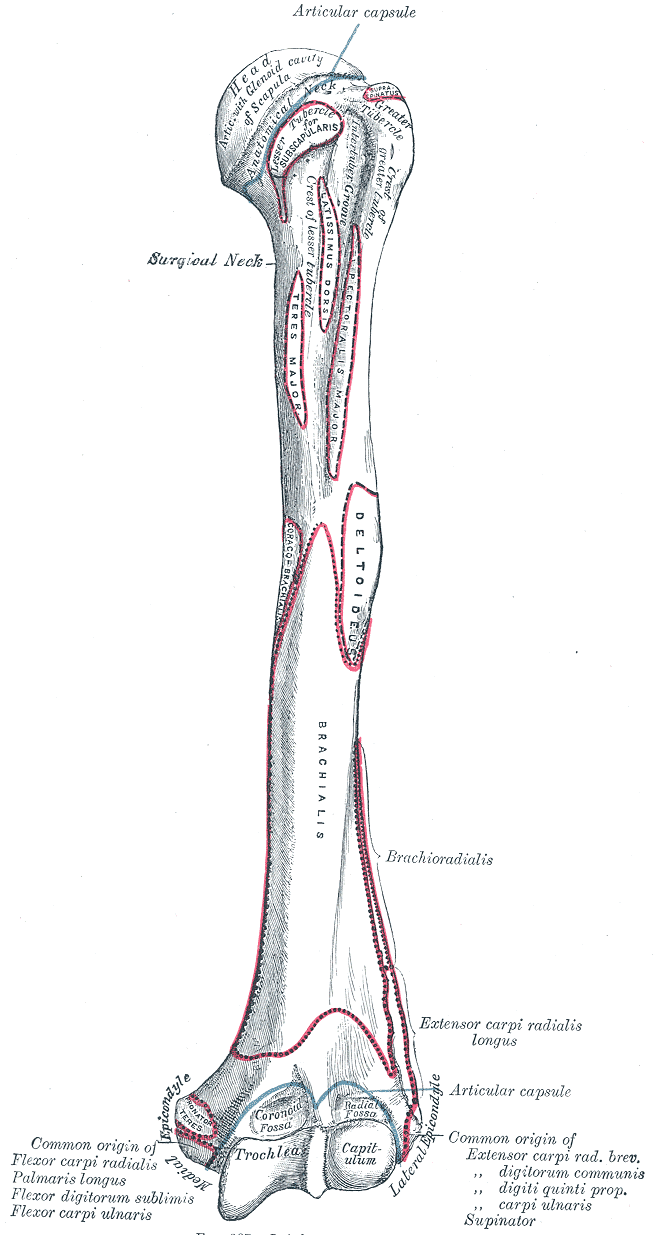
- Left humerus. Anterior view. (Radial fossa visible at bottom right.)

Details

Identifiers
- Latin: fossa radialis humeri
- TA98: A02.4.04.026
- TA2: 1206
- FMA: 23452

The radial fossa is a slight depression found on the humerus above the front part of the capitulum. It receives the anterior border of the head of the radius when the forearm is flexed.

== Structure ==
The joint capsule of the elbow attaches to the humerus just proximal to the radial fossa.

== Additional images ==
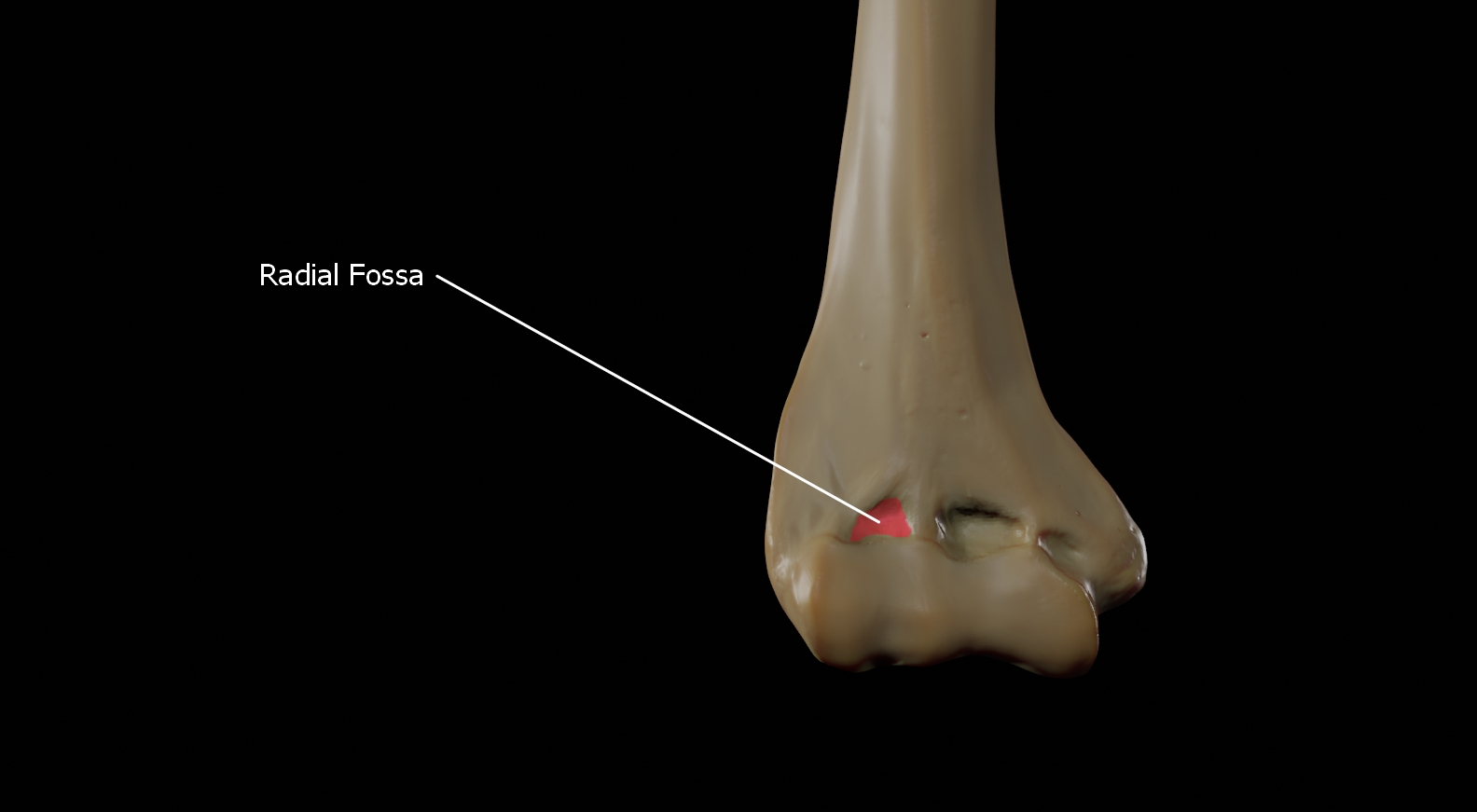
Radial fossa

Human arm bones diagram

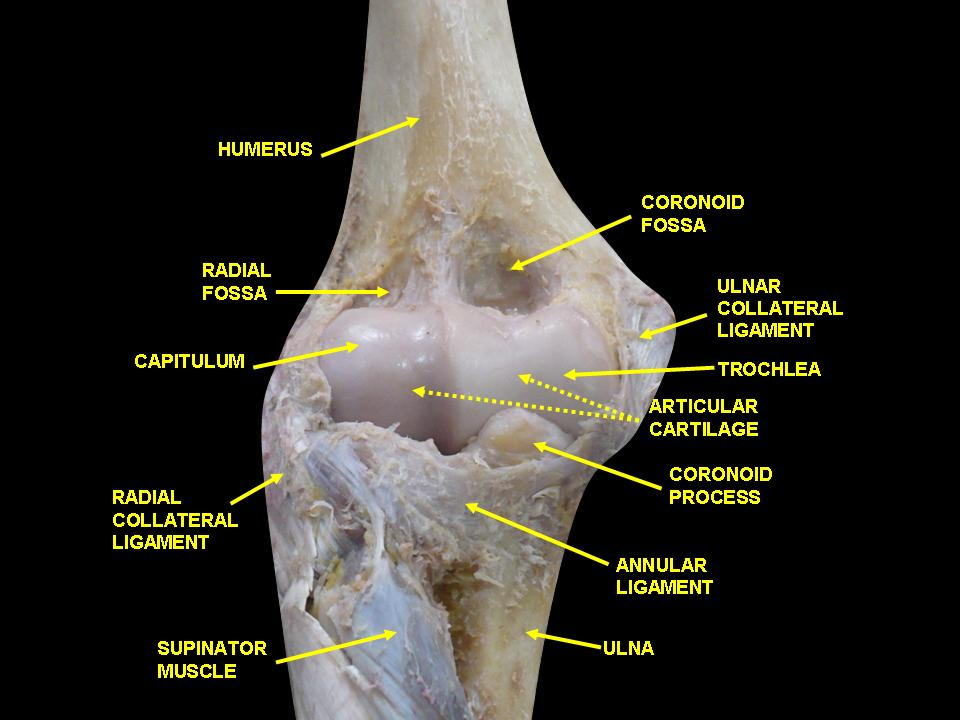
Elbow joint. Deep dissection. Anterior view.

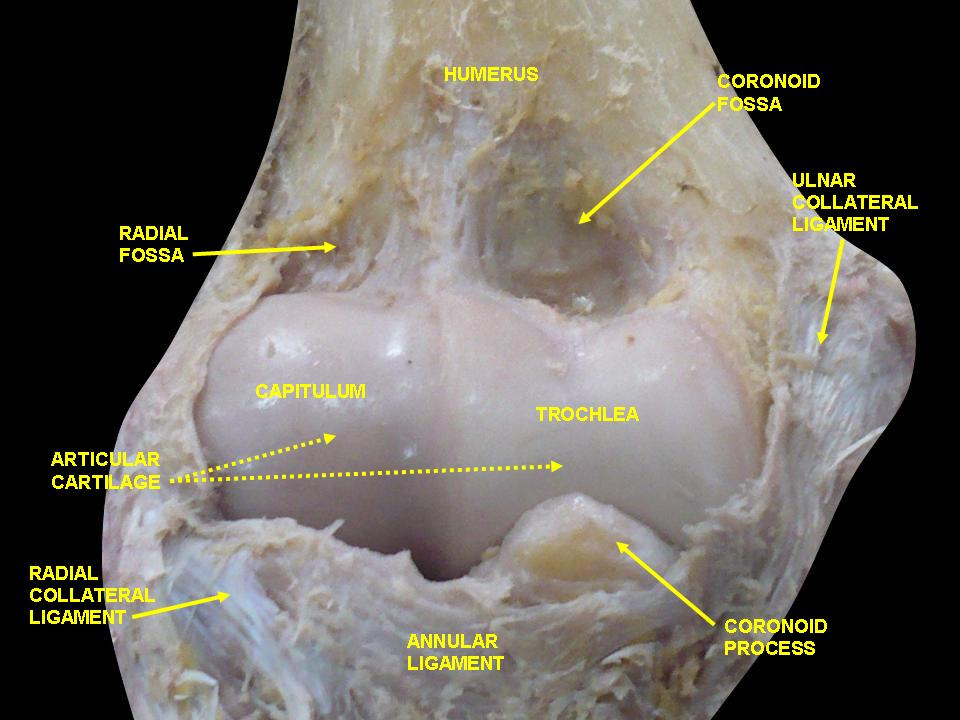
Elbow joint. Deep dissection. Anterior view.
