= Subluxation =

Partial dislocation of a joint or organ

A subluxation is an incomplete or partial dislocation of a joint or organ. According to the World Health Organization, a subluxation is a "significant structural displacement" and is therefore visible on static imaging studies, such as X-rays. Unlike real subluxations, the pseudoscientific concept of a chiropractic "vertebral subluxation" may or may not be visible on x-rays.

The term is used in the fields of medicine, dentistry, and chiropractic. There is no scientific evidence for the existence of chiropractic subluxations or proof they or their treatment have any effects on health.

== Medical ==
=== Joints ===
X-ray showing metacarpophalangeal subluxation of the thumb of a 71-year-old woman due to trapeziometacarpal osteoarthritis

A subluxation of a joint is where a connecting bone is partially out of the joint. In contrast to a luxation, which is a complete separation of the joint, a subluxation often returns to its normal position without additional help from a health professional. An example of a joint subluxation is a nursemaid's elbow, which is the subluxation of the head of the radius from the annular ligament. Other joints that are prone to subluxations are the shoulders, fingers, kneecaps, ribs, wrists, ankles, and hips affected by hip dysplasia. A spinal subluxation is visible on X-rays and can sometimes impinge on spinal nerve roots, causing symptoms in the areas served by those roots. In the spine, such a displacement may be caused by a fracture, spondylolisthesis, rheumatoid arthritis, severe osteoarthritis, falls, accidents and other traumas.

=== Ophthalmology ===
A subluxation of the lens within the eye is called ectopia lentis, wherein it is displaced or malpositioned. Subluxated lenses are frequently found in those who have had ocular trauma and those with certain systemic disorders, such as Marfan syndrome, Ehlers–Danlos syndrome, Loeys–Dietz syndrome and homocystinuria. Some subluxated lenses may require removal, as in the case of those that float freely or those that have opacified to form cataracts.

== Dental ==
A subluxation of a tooth is a dental traumatic injury in which the tooth has increased mobility but has not been displaced from the mandible or maxilla. This is a common condition and one of the most common dental traumatic disorders. Dental subluxation is a non-dental-urgency condition, i.e., unlikely to result in significant morbidity if not seen within 24 hours by a dentist, and usually treated conservatively: good oral hygiene with 0.12% chlorhexidine gluconate mouthwash, a soft and cold diet, and avoidance of smoking for several days. In painful situations, a temporary splinting of the injured tooth may relieve the pain.

Subluxation may also occur in the mandible from the articular groove of the temporal bone. The mandible can dislocate in the anterior, posterior, lateral, or superior position. Description of the dislocation is based on the location of the condyle in comparison to the temporal articular groove.

== Chiropractic ==
Unlike real subluxations, the pseudoscientific concept of a chiropractic "vertebral subluxation" may or may not be visible on x-rays. Nor may it involve a significant displacement or even pain or clear dysfunction. Straight chiropractors claim that vertebral subluxation has considerable health effects and also add a visceral component to the definition. Mainstream medicine and some mixer chiropractors consider these ideas to be pseudoscientific and dispute these claims, as there is no scientific evidence for the existence of chiropractic subluxations or proof they or their treatment have any effects on health.
