= Epicondyle of the humerus =

Epicondyle of the humerus may refer to:

- Lateral epicondyle of the humerus
- Medial epicondyle of the humerus
