= Proximal radioulnar articulation =

Joint of the elbow

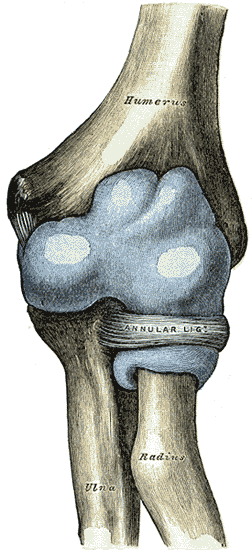
- Capsule of elbow-joint (distended). Anterior aspect.

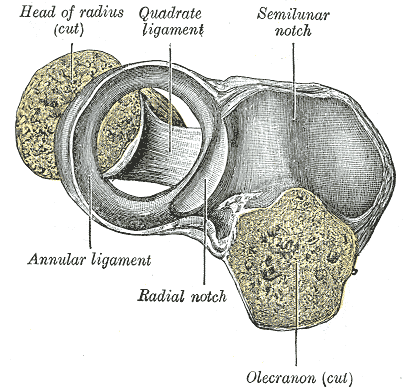
- Annular ligament of radius, from above. The head of the radius has been sawn off and the bone dislodged from the ligament.

Details

Identifiers
- Latin: articulatio radioulnaris proximalis
- TA98: A03.5.09.004
- TA2: 1775
- FMA: 38860

The proximal radioulnar articulation, also known as the proximal radioulnar joint (PRUJ), is a synovial pivot joint between the circumference of the head of the radius and the ring formed by the radial notch of the ulna and the annular ligament.

== Structure ==
The proximal radioulnar joint is a synovial pivot joint. It occurs between the circumference of the head of the radius and the ring formed by the radial notch of the ulna and the annular ligament. The interosseous membrane of the forearm and the annular ligament stabilise the joint.

A number of nerves run close to the proximal radioulnar joint, including:

- median nerve
- musculocutaneous nerve
- radial nerve

== See also ==
- Distal radioulnar articulation
- Supination
