= Humeroulnar joint =

Joint of the elbow

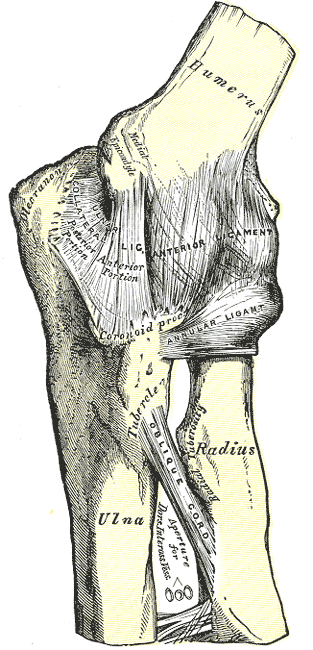
- Left elbow-joint, showing anterior and ulnar collateral ligaments

Details

Identifiers
- Latin: articulatio humeroulnaris
- TA98: A03.5.09.002
- TA2: 1773
- FMA: 38854

The humeroulnar joint (ulnohumeral or trochlear joint) is part of the elbow-joint. It is composed of two bones, the humerus and ulna, and is the junction between the trochlear notch of ulna and the trochlea of humerus. It is classified as a simple hinge-joint, which allows for movements of flexion, extension and circumduction. Owing to the obliquity of the trochlea of the humerus, this movement does not take place in the antero-posterior plane of the body of the humerus.

When the forearm is extended and supinated, the axis of the arm and forearm are not in the same line; the arm forms an obtuse angle with the forearm, known as the carrying angle. During flexion, however, the forearm and the hand tend to approach the middle line of the body, and thus enable the hand to be easily carried to the face.

The accurate adaptation of the trochlea of the humerus, with its prominences and depressions, to the trochlear notch of the ulna, prevents any lateral movement.

Flexion in the humeroulnar joint is produced by the action of the biceps brachii and brachialis, assisted by the brachioradialis, with a tiny contribution from the muscles arising from the medial epicondyle of the humerus.

Extension in the humeroulnar joint is produced by the triceps brachii and anconeus muscle, with a tiny contribution from the muscles arising from the lateral epicondyle of the humerus, such as the extensor digitorum muscle.

== Additional images ==
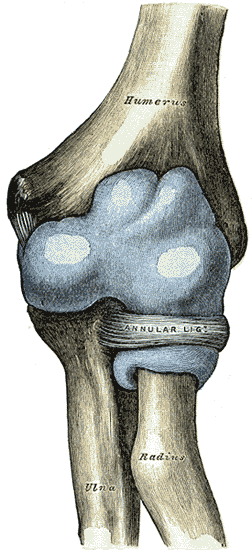
Capsule of elbow-joint (distended) seen from front

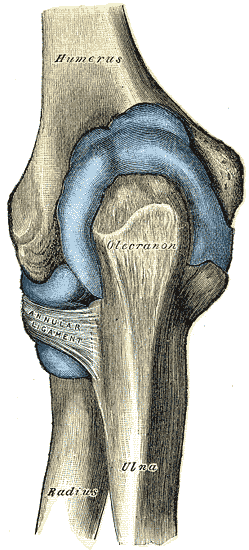
Capsule of elbow-joint (distended) seen from back

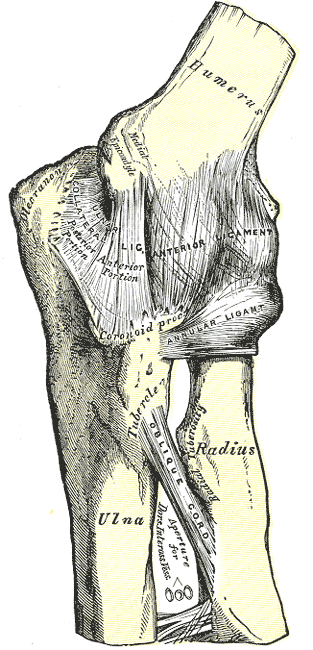
Left elbow-joint showing anterior and ulnar collateral ligaments

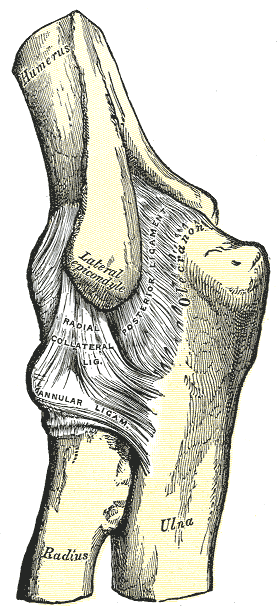
Left elbow-joint showing posterior and radial collateral ligaments

== See also ==
- Elbow
- Humeroradial joint
