= Common extensor tendon =

Tendon of the forearm

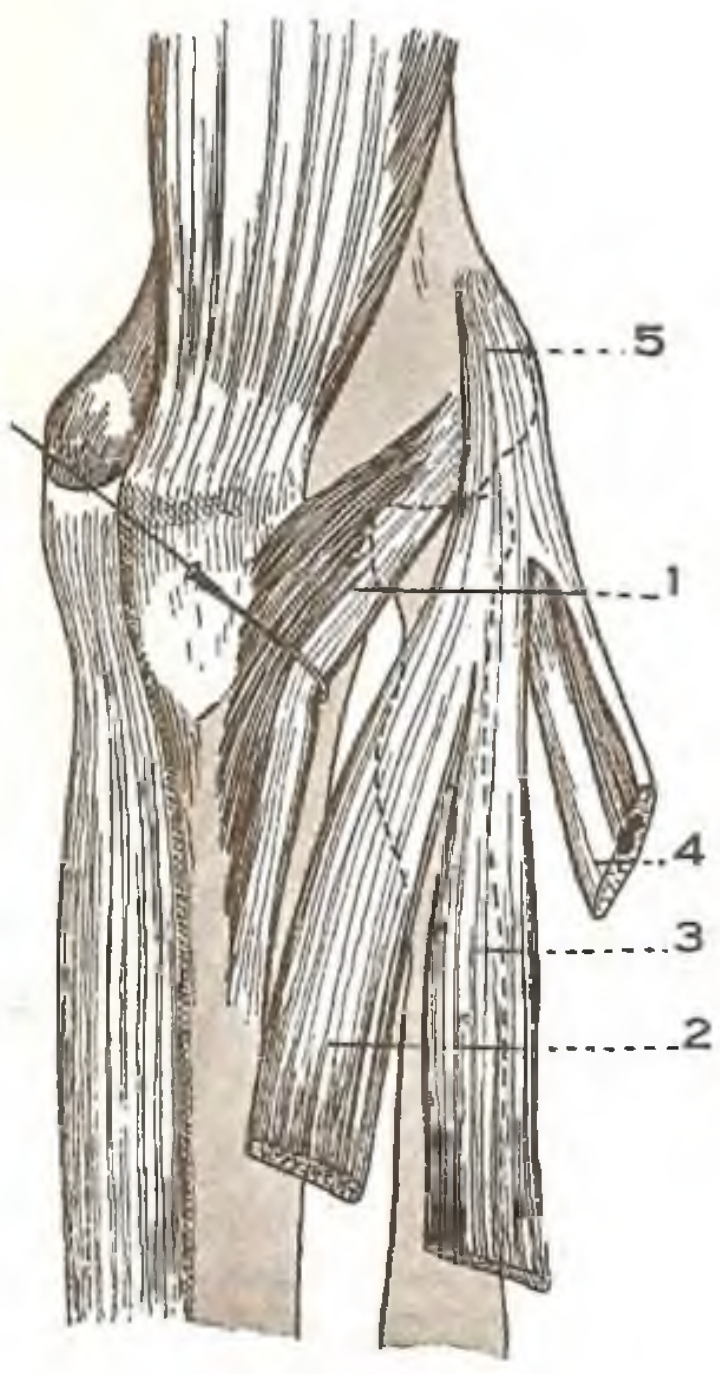
- Posterior view of muscles of right-sided upper limb, showing common extensor tendon. 1. Anconeus — 2. Extensor carpi ulnaris — 3. Extensor digitorum — 4. Extensor carpi radialis brevis. — 5. Common extensor tendon. (After Testut's Anatomy.)

Identifiers
- TA2: 2498
- FMA: 0326751

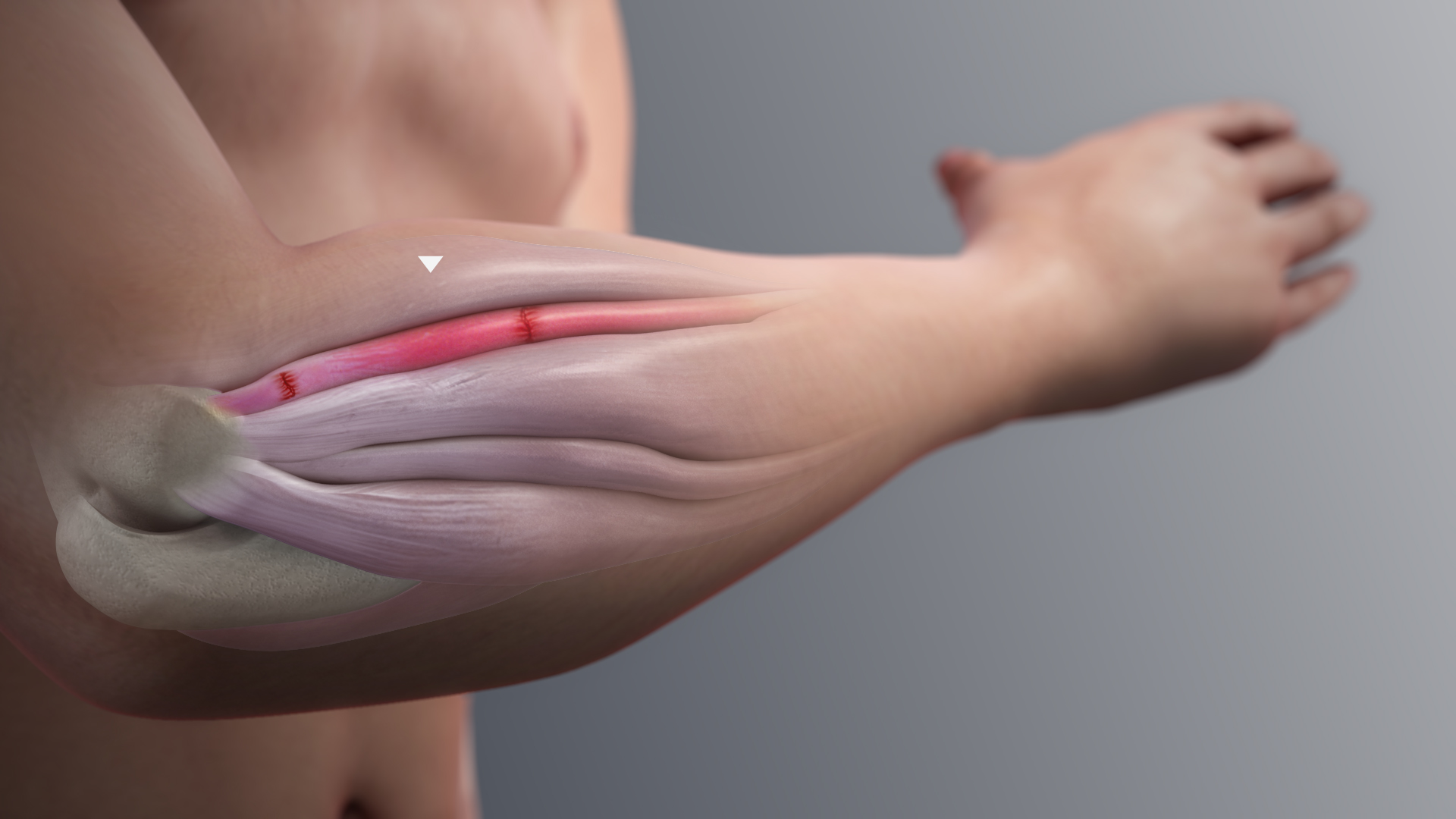
A 3D medical animation still shot illustrating inflammation of an extensor muscle of the forearm.

The common extensor tendon is a tendon that attaches to the lateral epicondyle of the humerus.

== Structure ==
The common extensor tendon serves as the upper attachment (in part) for the superficial muscles that are located on the posterior aspect of the forearm:

- Extensor carpi radialis brevis
- Extensor digitorum
- Extensor digiti minimi
- Extensor carpi ulnaris

The tendon of extensor carpi radialis brevis is usually the most major tendon to which the other tendons merge.

== Function ==
The common extensor tendon is the major attachment point for extensor muscles of the forearm. This enables finger extension and aids in forearm supination.

== Clinical significance ==
Lateral elbow pain can be caused by various pathologies of the common extensor tendon. Overuse injuries can lead to inflammation. Tennis elbow is a common issue with the common extensor tendon.

== See also ==
- Common flexor tendon
- Tennis elbow (lateral epicondylitis)
