= Capitulum of the humerus =

Structure of humerus

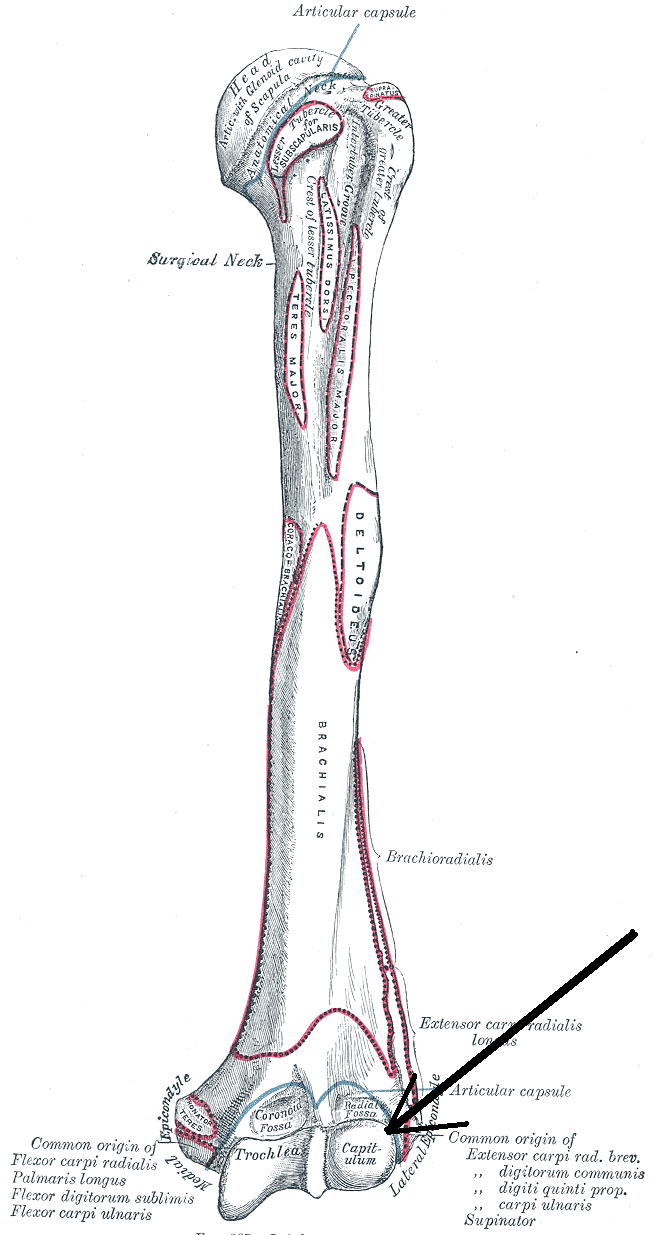
- Left humerus seen from front (capitulum visible at bottom right)

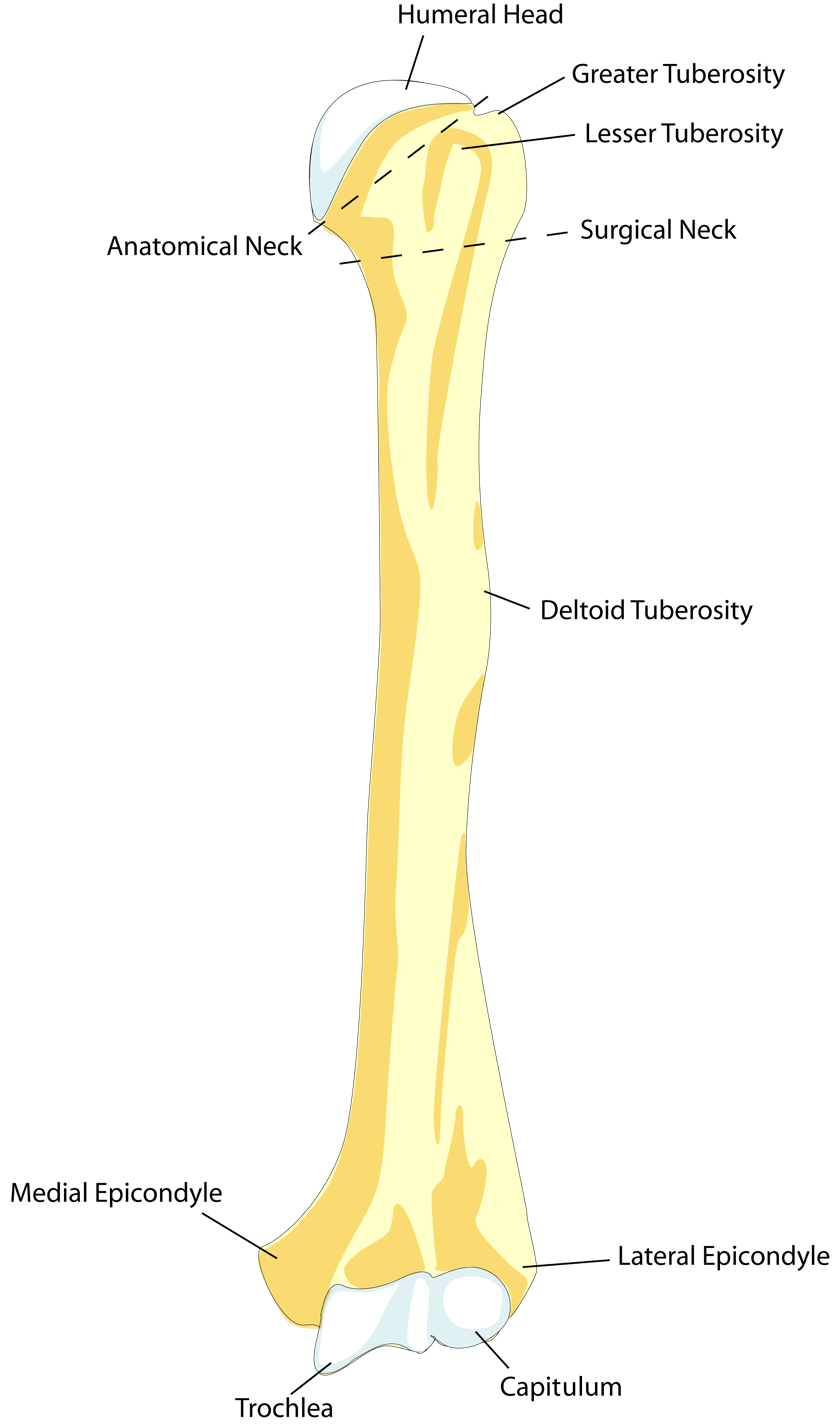
- Left humerus seen from front (part of the appendicular skeleton)

Details

Identifiers
- Latin: capitulum humeri
- TA98: A02.4.04.022
- TA2: 1202
- FMA: 23373

In human anatomy of the arm, the capitulum of the humerus is a smooth, rounded eminence on the lateral portion of the distal articular surface of the humerus. It articulates with the cup-shaped depression on the head of the radius, and is limited to the front and lower part of the bone.

In non-human tetrapods, the name capitellum is generally used, with "capitulum" limited to the anteroventral articular facet of the rib (in archosauromorphs).

== Lepidosauromorpha ==
Lepidosaurs show a distinct capitellum and trochlea on the centre of the ventral (anterior in upright taxa) surface of the humerus at the distal end.

== Archosauromorpha ==
In non-avian archosaurs, including crocodiles, the capitellum and the trochlea are no longer bordered by distinct etc.- and entepicondyles respectively, and the distal humerus consists two gently expanded condyles, one lateral and one medial, separated by a shallow groove and a supinator process. Romer (1976) homologizes the capitellum in Archosauromorphs with the groove separating the medial and lateral condyles.

In birds, where forelimb anatomy has an adaptation for flight, its functional if not ontogenetic equivalent is the dorsal condyle of the humerus.

== Additional images ==
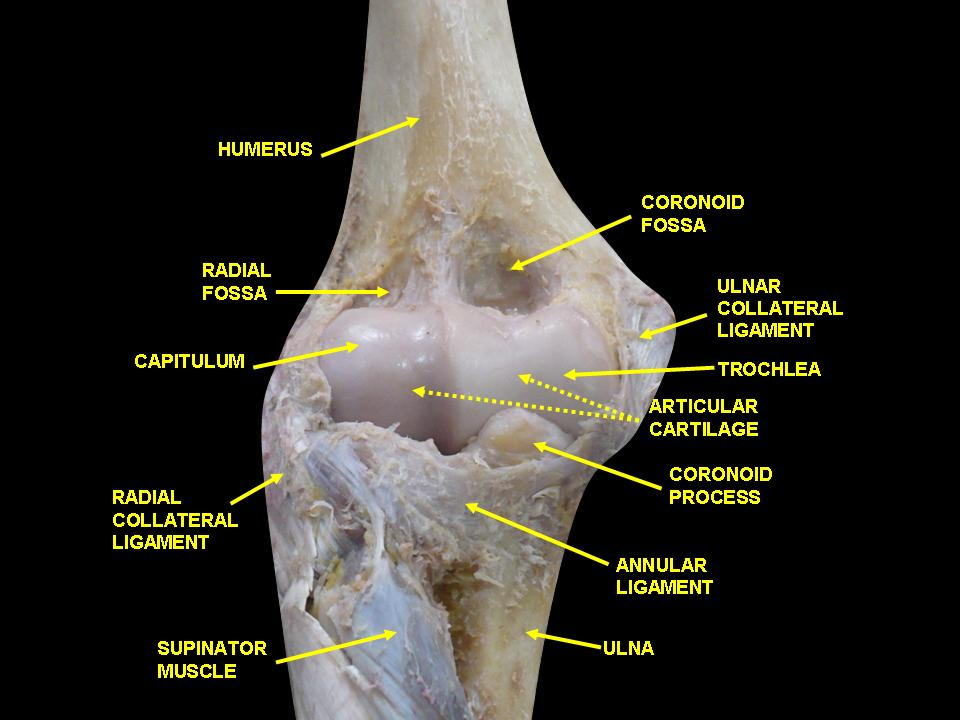
Elbow joint. Deep dissection. Anterior view.

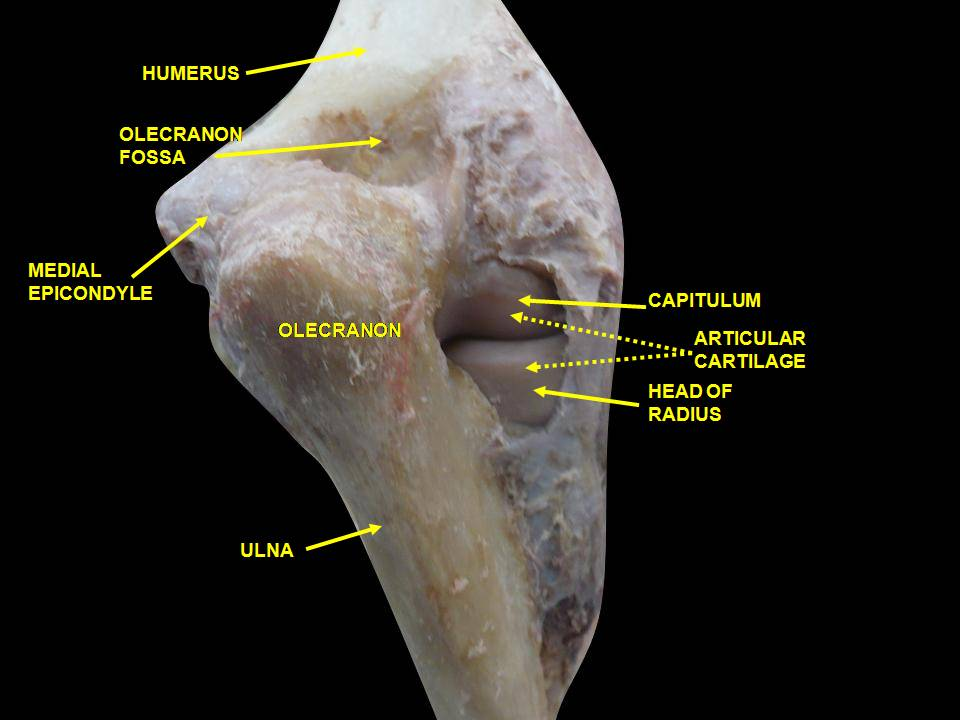
Elbow joint. Deep dissection. Posterior view.

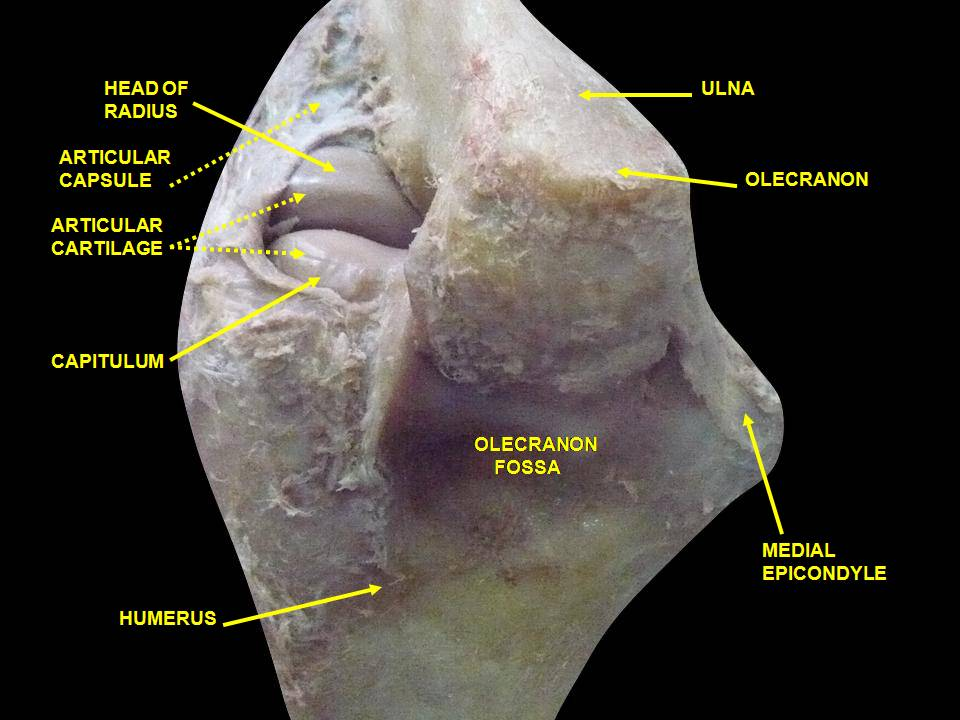
Elbow joint. Deep dissection. Posterior view.
