= Head of radius =

Bone of the arm

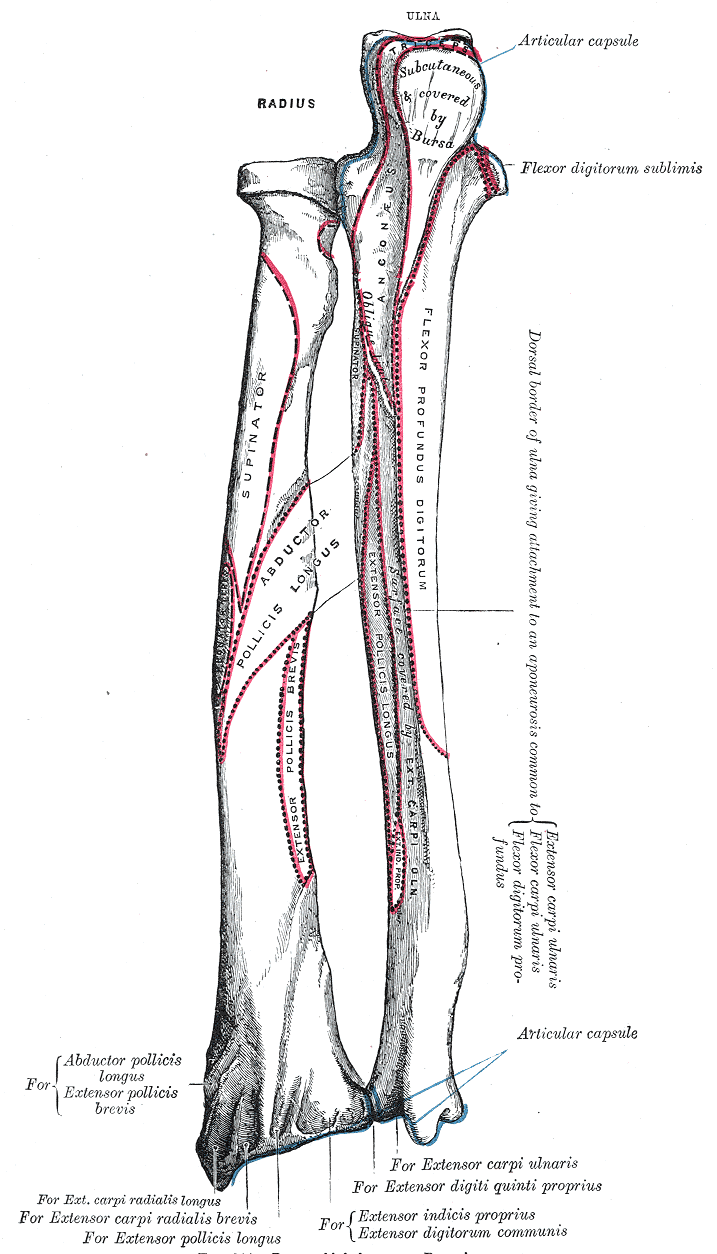
- The radius and ulna of the left forearm, posterior surface. The top is proximal (elbow) and bottom is distal (wrist).

Details

Identifiers
- Latin: caput radii
- TA98: A02.4.05.002
- TA2: 1211
- FMA: 33773

The head of radius is the superior (or upper) end of the radius, one of the two large bones of the forearm. It has a cylindrical form, and on its upper surface is a shallow cup or fovea for articulation with the capitulum of the humerus. The circumference of the head is smooth; it is broad medially where it articulates with the radial notch of the ulna, narrow in the rest of its extent, which is embraced by the annular ligament.

== Articular surfaces ==
The head of the radius is shaped to articulate with a complex of articular surfaces during both flexion-extension at the elbow and supination-pronation in the forearm:

=== Humeroradial joint ===
The head's proximal surface is concave and cup-shaped to correspond to the spherical surface of the capitulum of the humerus. The radius can thus glide on the capitulum during elbow flexion-extension while simultaneously rotate about its own main axis during supination-pronation.

Between the capitulum and the trochlea of the humerus is the capitulotrochlear groove. A semi-lunar surface around the circumference of head is shaped to articulate continuously with this groove.

The capitulum does not extend to the posterior side of the humerus and, consequently, during full elbow extension only the anterior half of the head articulates with the capitulum. In full flexion the head similarly reaches beyond the capitulum to enter the shallow radial fossa on the anterior side of the humerus.

=== Proximal radioulnar joint ===
The head is cylindrical to allow axial rotation of the radius, thus to articulate with the annular ligament and the radial notch on the ulna.

However, the head of the radius is not perfectly cylindrical but slightly oval. In anatomical position, its major axis (28 mm (1.1 in)) is directed antero-posteriorly and the shorter axis (24 mm (0.94 in)) lateralo-medially. Even though the annular ligament holds the head firmly in place, the ligament is still flexible enough to allow some stretching while the head rotates within it.

During pronation the radius is rotated so that the head's major axis reaches the radial notch on the ulna. This causes a small but significant lateral displacement of the radius' main axis — equal to half the difference between the two axes of the head (2 mm (0.079 in)) — just enough space to accommodate the radial tuberosity as it being moved medially.

== Additional images ==
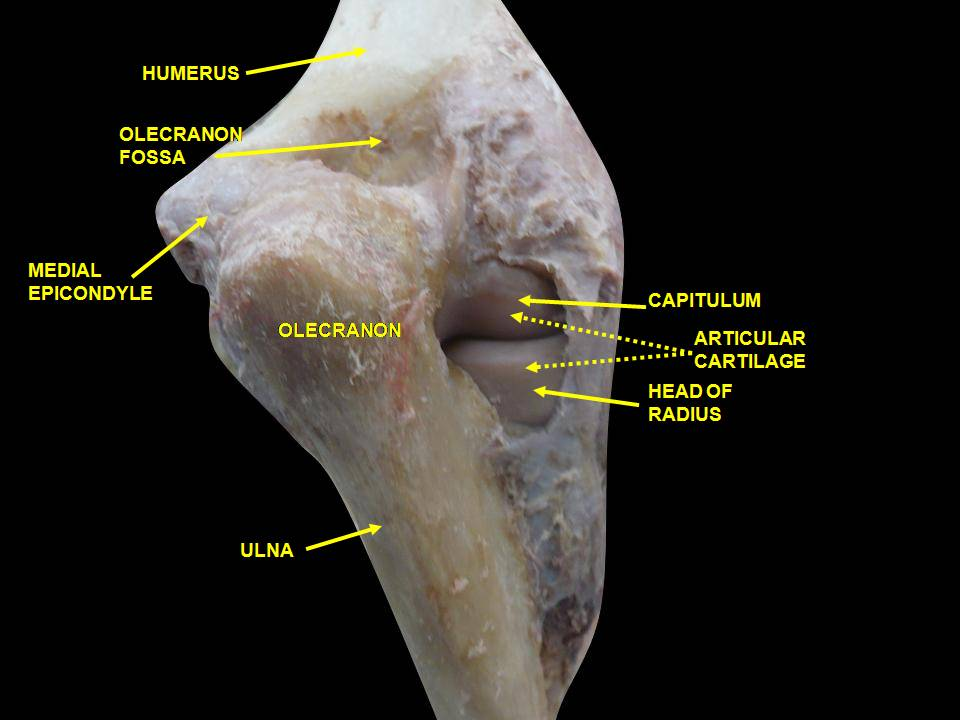
Elbow joint. Deep dissection. Posterior view.

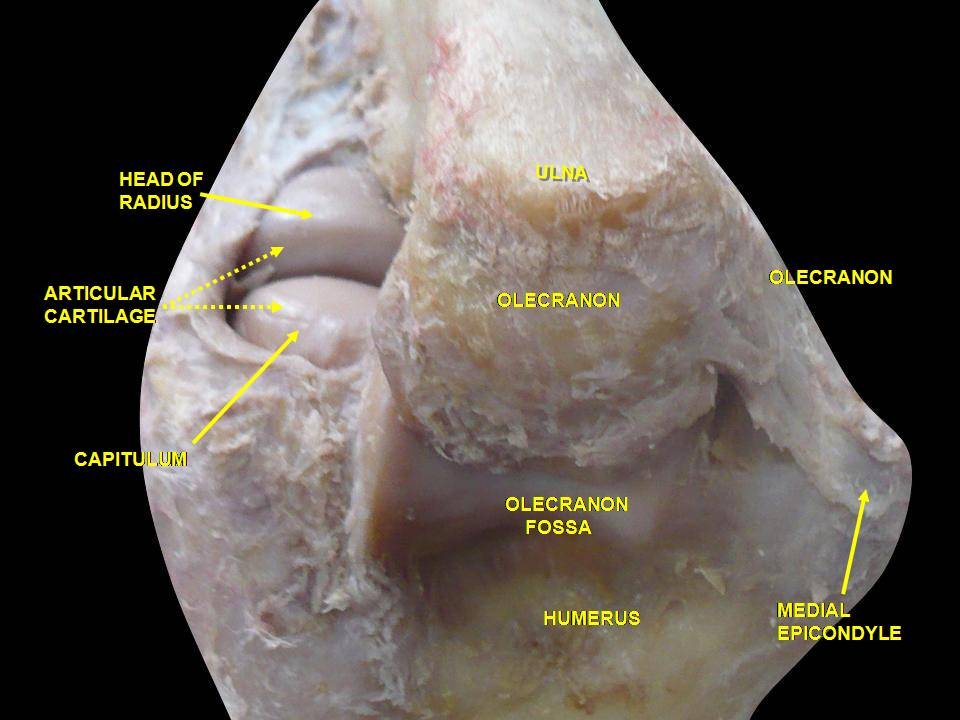
Elbow joint. Deep dissection. Posterior view.

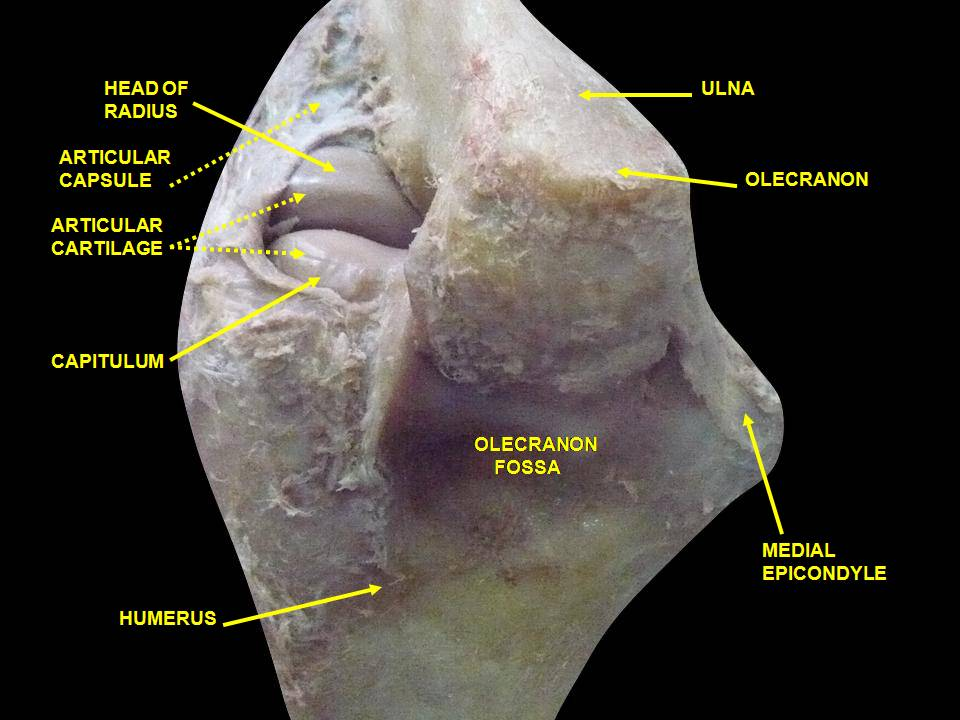
Elbow joint. Deep dissection. Posterior view.

== See also ==
- Nursemaid's elbow
