= Annular ligament of radius =

Anatomic structure

Annular ligament
- Capsule of elbow-joint (distended). Anterior aspect.

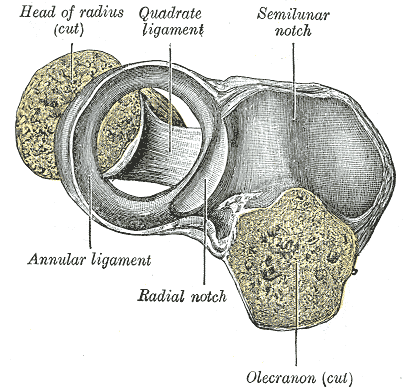
- Annular ligament of radius, from above. The head of the radius has been sawn off and the bone dislodged from the ligament.

Details

Identifiers
- Latin: ligamentum anulare radii
- Greek: δακτυλιοειδής σύνδεσμος
- TA98: A03.5.09.007
- TA2: 1778
- FMA: 38872

The annular ligament (orbicular ligament) is a strong band of fibers that encircles the head of the radius, and retains it in contact with the radial notch of the ulna.

Per Terminologia Anatomica 1998, the spelling is "anular", but the spelling "annular" is frequently encountered. Indeed, the most recent version of Terminologia Anatomica (2019) uses "annular" as the preferred English spelling.

== Structure ==
The annular ligament is attached by both its ends to the anterior and posterior margins of the radial notch of the ulna, together with which it forms the articular surface that surrounds the head and neck of the radius. The ligament is strong and well defined, yet its flexibility permits the slightly oval head of the radius to rotate freely during pronation and supination.

The head of the radius is wider than the bone's neck, and, because the annular ligament embraces both, the radial head is "trapped" inside the ligament which thus acts to prevent distal displacement of the radius. It helps to stabilise the proximal radial head, and the radioulnar joint.

Superiorly, the ligament is supported by attachments to the radial collateral ligament and the fibrous capsule of the elbow joint. Inferiorly, a few fibres attached to the neck of the radius support a fold of the synovial membrane without interfering with the movements at the joint.

The fibrocartilage on the upper part of the ligament is continuous with the hyaline cartilage of the radial notch. At the posterior attachment the ligament widens to reach above and below the radial notch.

A thickened band which extends from the inferior border of the annular ligament below the radial notch to the neck of the radius is known as the quadrate ligament.

== Clinical significance ==
Children whose proximal radial epiphyseal plate has not finished fusing may suffer dislocations of this joint, called pulled elbow or Nursemaid's elbow. A common cause of this dislocation is a caregiver sharply jerking a child by the arm, for example when grabbing the child away from traffic or some other danger.

== Additional images ==
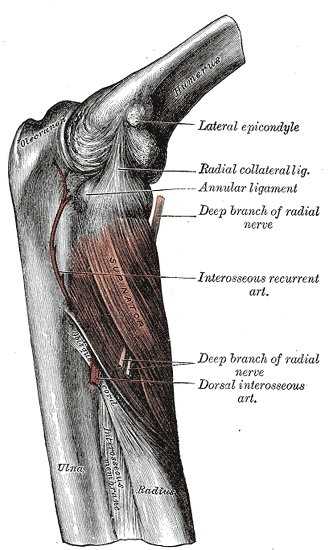
The supinator muscle

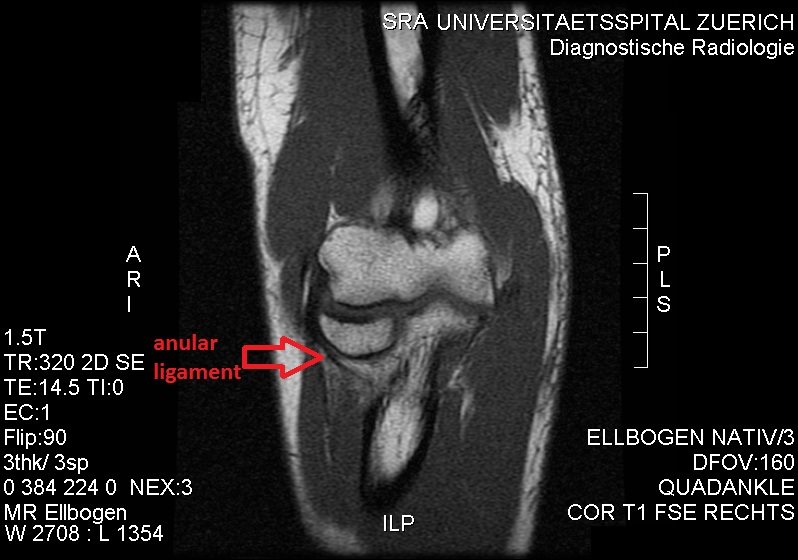
T1 weighted MRI showing the anular ligament

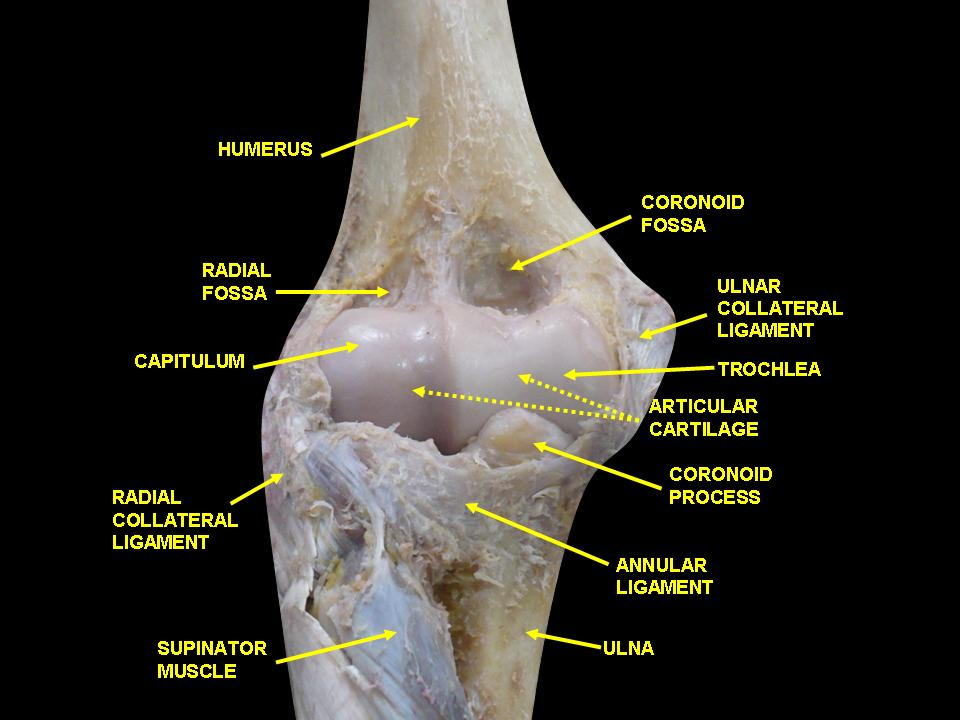
Elbow joint. Deep dissection. Anterior view.

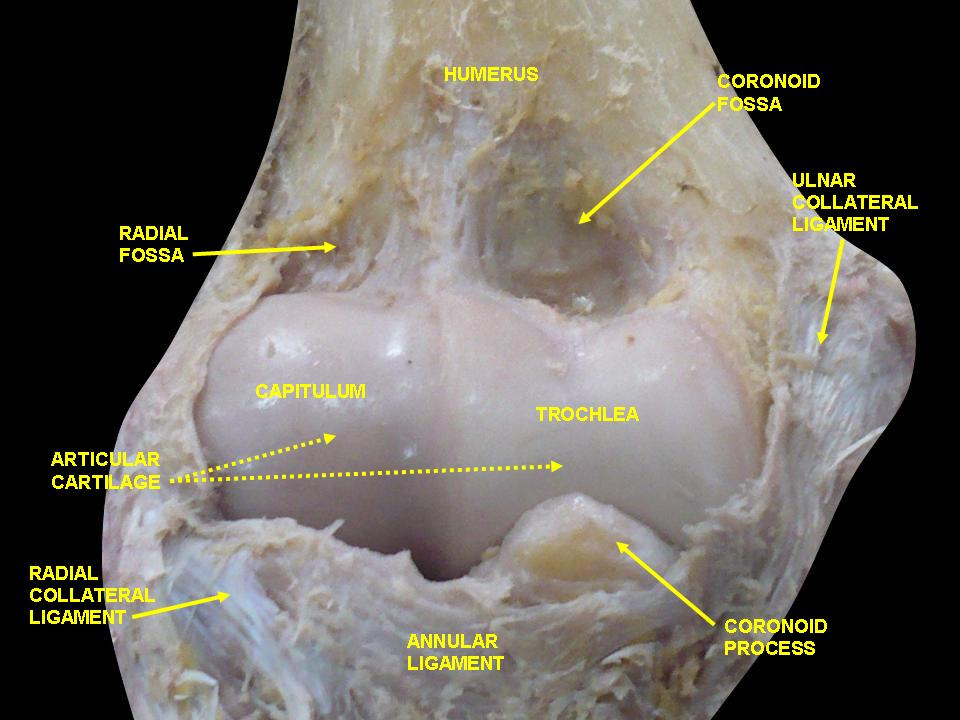
Elbow joint. Deep dissection. Anterior view.
