= Radial notch =

Dent of the ulna receiving the radius

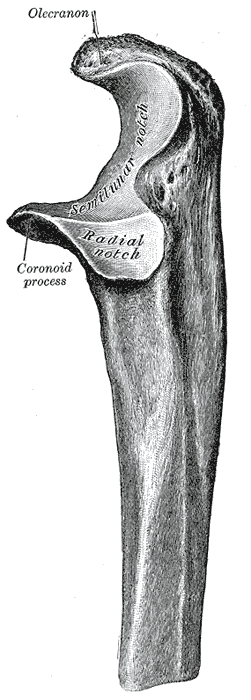
- Upper extremity of left ulna. Lateral aspect. (Radial notch visible at center top.)

Details

Identifiers
- Latin: incisura radialis ulnae
- TA98: A02.4.06.005
- TA2: 1234
- FMA: 23618

The radial notch of the ulna (lesser sigmoid cavity) is a narrow, oblong, articular depression on the lateral side of the coronoid process; it receives the circumferential articular surface of the head of the radius.

It is concave from before backward, and its prominent extremities serve for the attachment of the annular ligament.

== Additional images ==
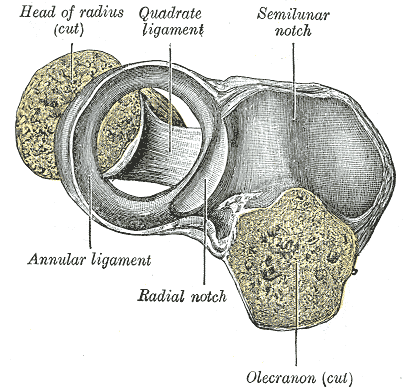
Annular ligament of radius, from above.
