= Coronoid fossa of the humerus =

Anatomical feature

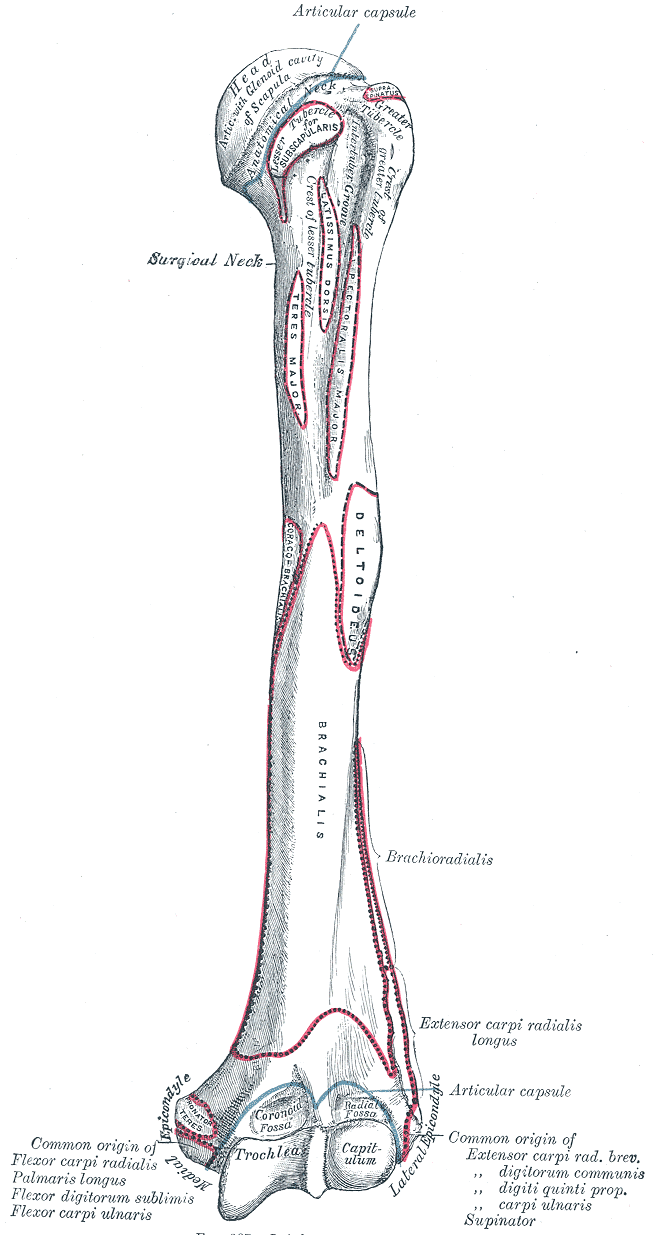
- Left humerus. Anterior view. (Coronoid fossa visible at bottom center, on left side.)

Details

Identifiers
- Latin: fossa coronoidea humeri
- TA98: A02.4.04.025
- TA2: 1205
- FMA: 23451

Superior to the anterior portion of the trochlea is a small depression, the coronoid fossa, which receives the coronoid process of the ulna during flexion of the forearm. It is directly adjacent to the radial fossa of the humerus.

== Additional images ==
Human arm bones diagram

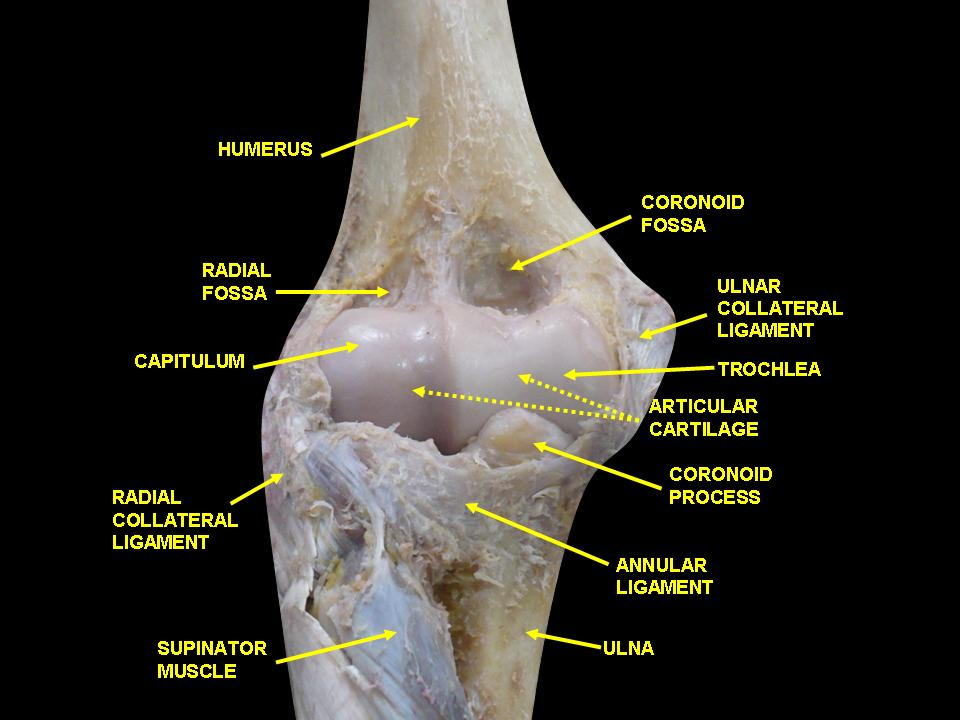
Elbow joint. Deep dissection. Anterior view.

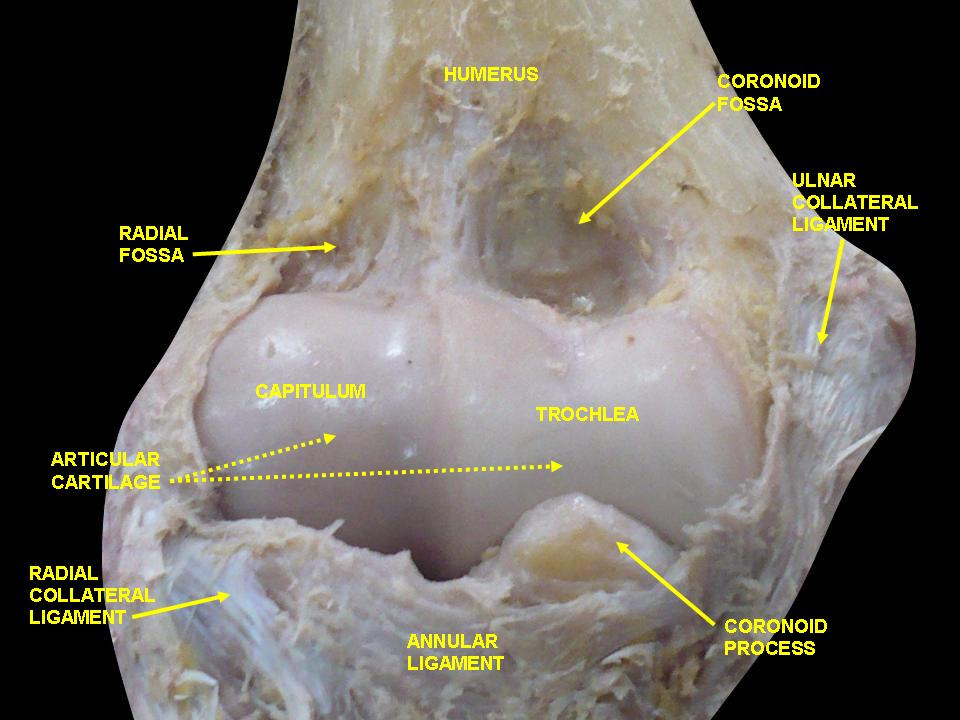
Elbow joint. Deep dissection. Anterior view.
