= Entepicondylar foramen =

Opening in the distal end of the humerus

The entepicondylar foramen is an opening in the distal (far) end of the humerus (upper arm bone) present in some mammals. It is often present in primitive placentals, such as the enigmatic Madagascan Plesiorycteropus. In most Neotominae and all Tylomyinae among cricetid rodents, it is located above the medial epicondyle of the humerus, but it is absent in all Sigmodontinae and Arvicolinae and this trait has been suggested as a synapomorphy for the former subfamily.

== See also ==
- Supratrochlear foramen

== Literature cited ==
- MacPhee, R.D.E. (1994). "Morphology, adaptations, and relationships of Plesiorycteropus, and a diagnosis of a new order of eutherian mammals". Bulletin of the American Museum of Natural History. 220: 1–214. hdl:2246/828.
- Weksler, M. (2006). "Phylogenetic relationships of oryzomyine rodents (Muroidea: Sigmodontinae): separate and combined analyses of morphological and molecular data". Bulletin of the American Museum of Natural History. 296: 1–149. doi:10.1206/0003-0090(2006)296[0001:PROORM]2.0.CO;2. hdl:2246/5777. S2CID 86057173.
