= Supratrochlear foramen =

Anatomical landmark

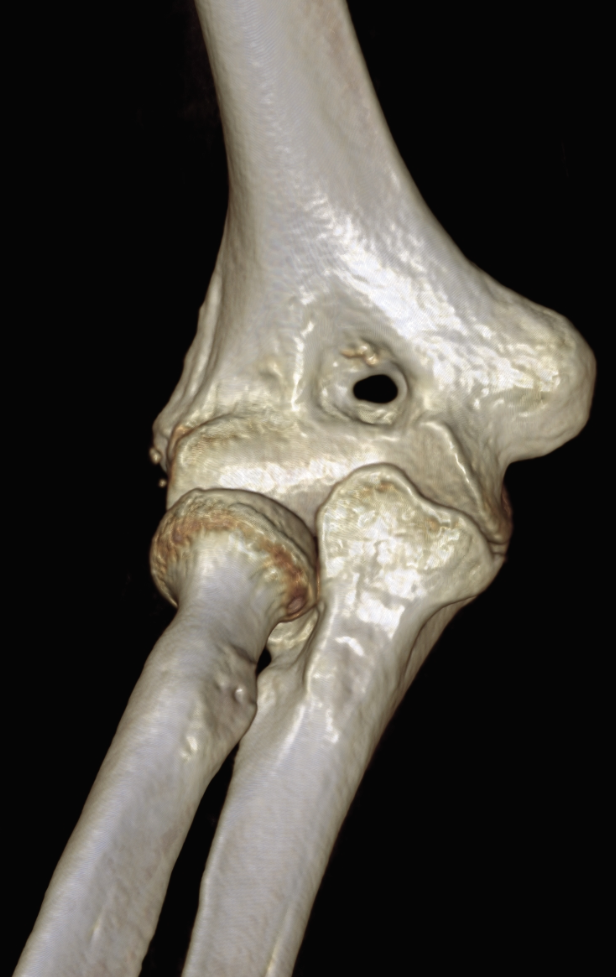
Supratrochlear foramen in a 66-year old human. CT volume rendering.

The supratrochlear foramen is a small hole located above the trochlea of the humerus of several mammals, it is found frequently in dogs and sometimes in humans, especially women and in the left humerus. It is covered by a layer of connective tissue.

It is not currently recognized with a Terminologia Anatomica name in human anatomy, but the term is still found in older texts and in discussing anatomical variation.

== See also ==
- Entepicondylar foramen
