= Cubital tunnel syndrome =

Compression of the ulnar nerve in the elbow

- Other names: Ulnar neuropathy at elbow
- Nerves of the left upper extremity. (Ulnar nerve labeled at center)
- Specialty: Neurology, physical medicine and rehabilitation, orthopedic surgery
- Symptoms: Hand atrophy, numbness and weakness of hand, 4th, and 5th fingers
- Causes: Nerve entrapment, Tumor
- Diagnostic method: Electrodiagnosis, physical examination, imaging
- Treatment: Positional changes, NSAIDs, elbow splinting/bracing, surgery

Cubital tunnel syndrome (CuTS) is an entrapment neuropathy, or nerve compression syndrome, a condition caused by compression, traction, or friction of the ulnar nerve at the elbow. Nerve compression is also known as a trapped nerve. The ulnar nerve travels from the brachial plexus down the length of the arm to the hand. Along its course, it may become compressed at several sites. At the elbow, the ulnar nerve passes through the cubital tunnel, where ulnar nerve compression most commonly occurs. The ulnar nerve provides motor and sensory innervation to the forearm and hand, and its compression can cause numbness and other symptoms associated with cubital tunnel syndrome, commonly in the fourth and fifth fingers. Symptoms may include a claw hand.

Cubital tunnel syndrome is an ulnar neuropathy that can be caused not only by compression at the cubital tunnel level itself, but can also be caused by movement of the elbow. The volume of the cubital tunnel may be reduced when being moved from full extension to a lesser degree of flexion. In many cases, the cause of CuTS is unknown.

Diagnosis can be made with clinical symptoms, physical examination, imaging, and electrodiagnostic tests. There is currently no standardized method for diagnosing CuTS. Common physical exam findings would involve testing for paresthesia symptoms with a Tinel's test or checking for sensation in the 4th and 5th digits.

Conservative management of CuTS includes positional/ergonomic changes to reduce elbow flexion, elbow bracing, NSAIDs, and physical or occupational therapy. Surgery to decompress or relocate the ulnar nerve is the only disease-modifying treatment.

== Anatomy ==
The ulnar nerve arises from the medial cord of the brachial plexus , containing mostly C8 and T1 nerve fibers. While originally starting in the anterior compartment of the arm, the nerve enters the posterior compartment prior to arriving in the cubital tunnel. The cubital tunnel is an anatomical space that lies within the dorsomedial aspect of the elbow. The ulnar nerve lies within this groove and is bordered medially by the humeral medial epicondyle and laterally by the ulna's olecranon process. The band of tissue that overlies the cubital tunnel is often called Osborne's ligament and connects the heads of the flexor carpi ulnaris muscle. Alternative names for Osborne's ligament include Osborne's fascia, Osborne's band, or the cubital tunnel retinaculum. There are several anatomic variations of Osborne's ligament that range from its absence to increased thickness, or the fascia being replaced altogether by the aconeus epitrochlearis, an accessory muscle. An additional fibrous band known as Struthers' ligament or arcade exists more proximally to the cubital tunnel connecting the supracondylar humeral process and the medial humeral epicondyle.

== Pathophysiology ==
Causes of nerve injury can vary from direct pressure, nerve sliding, trauma, or overuse of a joint. Cubital tunnel syndrome most often describes a compression of the ulnar nerve underneath Osborne's ligament, but the Struthers' ligament could be another etiology that is more proximal in origin. There are several sites of possible compression, traction, or friction of the ulnar nerve as it courses behind the elbow. As the elbow flexes, this leads to a decreased cross-sectional area of the cubital tunnel and potential compression of the ulnar nerve. This is thought to worsen neuropathy symptoms overnight as elbows and wrists tend to flex during sleep.

There are a number of modifiable risk factors that are associated with cubital tunnel syndrome, including smoking, diabetes, hypertension, and an elevated body mass index. Additional comorbid conditions were associated with concomitant carpal tunnel syndrome, osteoarthritis, rheumatoid arthritis, and gastroesophageal reflux disease.

== Epidemiology ==
Cubital tunnel syndrome is the second most prevalent compression neuropathy of the upper extremity, following carpal tunnel syndrome. While the symptomatic prevalence is roughly estimated to be around 5.9%, there is a notable lack of epidemiological studies. Furthermore, the prevalence could potentially be underestimated due to a lack of specific diagnostic criteria or self-treatment with conservative measures such as over-the-counter medications and rest.

== Signs and symptoms ==
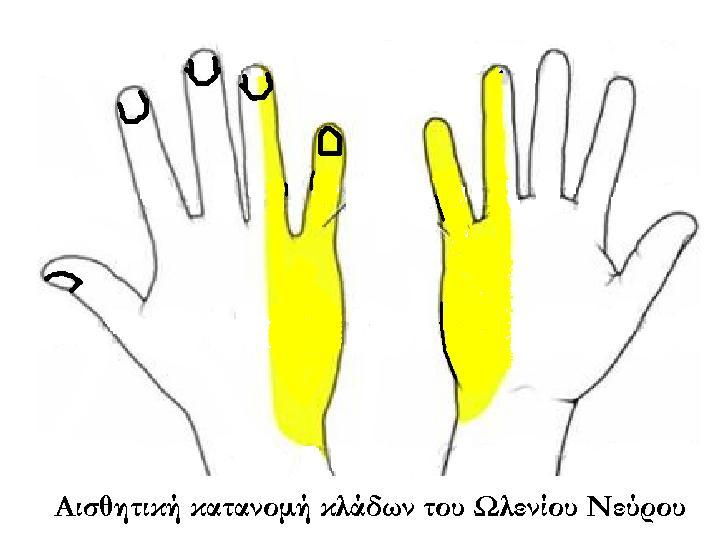
Sensory distribution of the ulnar nerve

Early characteristic symptoms tend to involve sensation, including numbness and tingling in the 4th and 5th fingers and the ulnar aspect of the hand. These areas process sensation through the ulnar nerve. Numbness or tingling sensations tend to worsen at night or with activities that involve flexing the elbow joint. As the neuropathy advances, loss of sensation could replace the paresthesia symptoms.

Motor function tends to be impacted later, with fine motor skills of the hand being affected. Motor function of the ulnar nerve is responsible for thumb adduction and flexion of the wrist, 4th, and 5th fingers. Weakness in these muscle groups can be observed. As the compression progresses to a chronic stage, atrophy in the hypothenar muscle belly can be appreciated.

== Diagnosis ==
There is not a consensus standard to diagnose cubital tunnel syndrome, but a combination of physical exam, imaging, and electrodiagnostic testing are utilized. Still, 93% of surgeons order preoperative tests (most order electrodiagnostics only, whilst others order a mixture of electrodiagnostics and imaging). Moreover, 6 in 10 surgeons still operate when test results are normal. Overall, there is considerable uncertainty over the utility, cost-effectiveness and thresholds of medical tests for diagnosing CuTS.

=== Physical exam ===
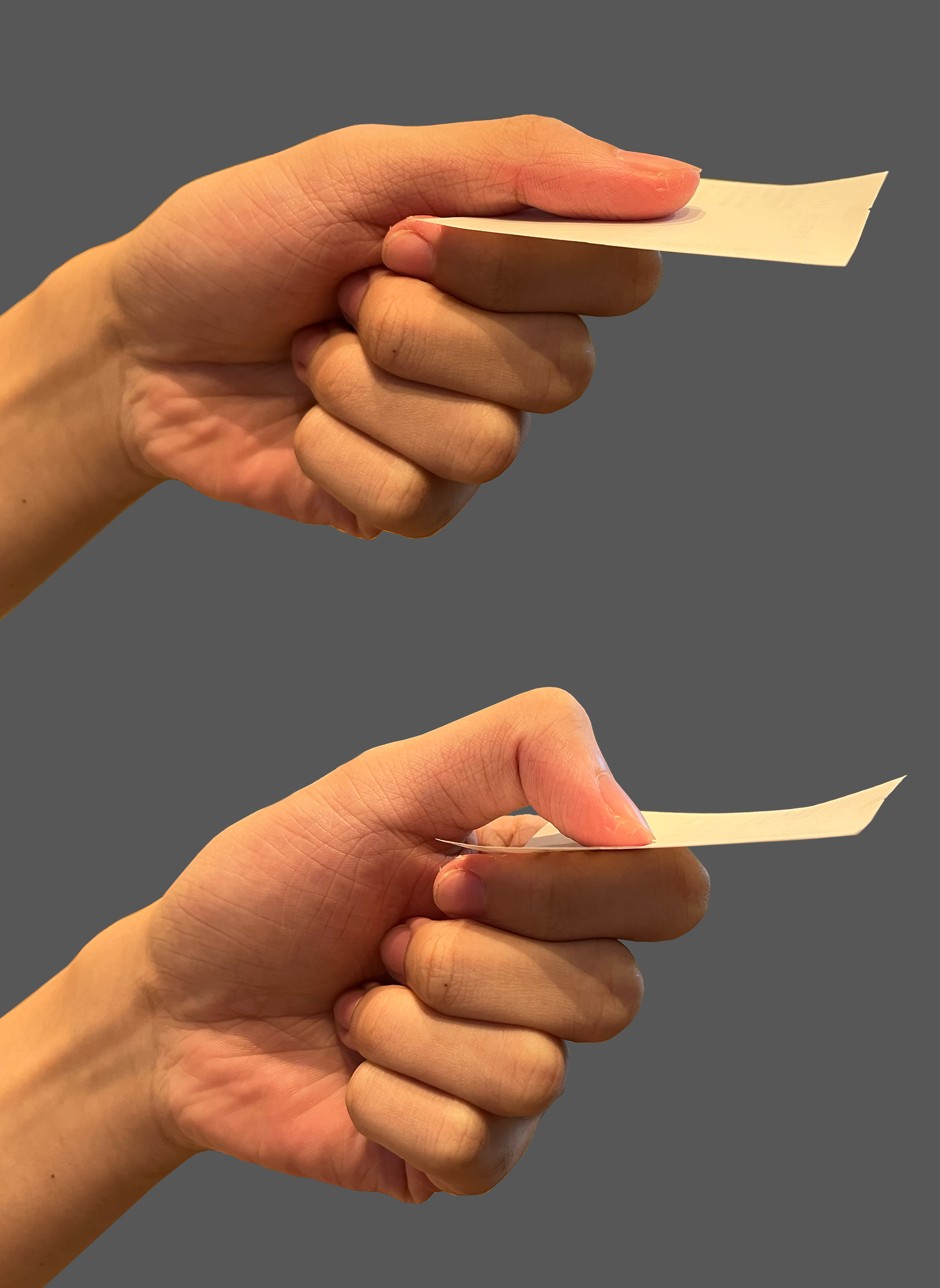
Negative (above) and positive (below) Froment's sign indicating an ulnar nerve injury

Clinical examination should include inspection of the hand to see hypothenar muscle atrophy and checking sensation and strength.

The diagnosis of CuTS can be further supported with some observable signs or maneuvers. These signs include the following:

- Tinel's sign is performed by tapping over the ulnar nerve at the medial aspect of the elbow. A positive sign would elicit reproducible numbness, tingling, or shock-like sensation in the ulnar nerve distribution.
- An elbow flexion test is performed with the shoulder abducted and internally rotated. The elbow is subsequently brought into flexion, and a positive test would produce neuropathy symptoms in the ulnar nerve distribution.
- Wartenberg's sign is characterized by the involuntary abduction of the 5th finger. This occurs because the ulnar nerve innervates muscles that adduct the 5th digit. An injury to the ulnar nerve could result in an unopposed abduction.
- Froment's sign involves having the patient hold a thin object, usually paper, in between the thumb and index finger in a pinch-like fashion. The ulnar nerve innervates the adductor pollicis muscle, and an injury to the nerve would result in a compensatory behavior to accomplish the task of pinching the paper. A positive sign involves flexion of the interphalangeal thumb joint instead of adduction of the thumb.
- Duchenne's sign, or more commonly referred to as the ulnar claw, occurs due to atrophy of the intrinsic hand muscles. This would result in hyperextension of the metacarpophalangeal joint and flexion of the proximal and distal interphalangeal joints of the 4th and 5th digit.

=== Imaging ===
Imaging can help examine structural causes of CuTS. Ultrasound is a modality used to help diagnose CuTS by measuring the cross-sectional area of the ulnar nerve at the medial epicondyle. When a nerve is compressed or injured, it may swell and become inflamed. When the swelling results in a cross-sectional area greater than 10 mm², this serves as a diagnostic cutoff.

X-rays are an imaging modality that helps detect bony abnormalities that can cause nerve compression. Examples include trauma to the elbow joint, osteophytes, or heterotopic ossification.

Magnetic resonance imaging (MRI) is useful for detecting nerve swelling, nerve compression by surrounding structures, high signal intensities, or a combination of the aforementioned findings. MRIs have also been shown to detect nerve changes in earlier stages of CuTS that may not yet be present on electrodiagnostic testing. While these findings may be evident on MRI, the degree of nerve enlargement or signal intensity did not correlate with symptom severity. Therefore, it is deemed that MRI has diagnostic usefulness but not prognostic predictability.

=== Electrodiagnostic studies ===
There are two components to electrodiagnostic studies, electromyography (EMG) and nerve conduction studies (NCS).

EMG evaluates how the ulnar nerve communicates with innervated muscles such as the abductor digiti minimi and the first dorsal interossei by observing the electrical activity. In the early stages of nerve compression, the EMG would yield a negative/normal result. As the compression advances toward axonal loss, the EMG will show evidence of muscle denervation and nerve demyelination, including abnormal spontaneous activity and reduced motor unit recruitment respectively.

The NCS evaluates electrical conduction of the ulnar nerve, which assists in determining the site and severity of nerve compression. When the ulnar nerve is compressed, the speed at which electrical activity is communicated slows down. According to the American Association of Neuromuscular & Electrodiagnostic Medicine (AANEM), the diagnosis of CuTS can be made through having one of the two criteria:

1. Across the elbow, the ulnar nerve has a conduction velocity slower than 50 m/s.
2. Comparing above the elbow to below the elbow, there is a velocity difference of greater than 10 m/s.

=== Differential diagnosis ===
For patients experiencing neck pain with additional hand numbness, tingling, and weakness, a diagnosis of cervical radiculopathy should be considered. Neck movement can provoke pain in the arm and paresthesia in the hand. This can be tested with a Spurling's maneuver during physical examination. Electromyography and cervical spine imaging would help differentiate cervical radiculopathy from CuTS.

An alternate, but less common, site of ulnar nerve compression is ulnar tunnel. Also known as Guyon's canal syndrome, this condition involves compression of the ulnar nerve at the wrist. Symptoms are more commonly exacerbated by pressure on the wrist, with activities such as cycling or weight lifting. In ulnar tunnel syndrome, we would see normal sensation on the dorsal aspect of the hand. This is due to the dorsal ulnar cutaneous nerve branching prior to compression in the ulnar tunnel. Whereas in CuTS, the dorsum of the hand would be affected. Electrodiagnostic testing would also localize the site of compression to the ulnar tunnel.

Thoracic outlet syndrome (TOS) involves compression of the neurovascular structures at the thoracic outlet, including the subclavian vasculature and the lower trunk of the brachial plexus. Because the lower trunk of the brachial plexus contains the C8 and T1 nerve roots, thoracic outlet syndrome can cause ulnar-sided pain similar to CuTS. However, TOS is more likely to present with pain throughout the entire hand. TOS is also more likely to experience worsening of symptoms with activities that involve reaching overhead. There are physical exam maneuvers that can test for this, such as Adson's test and Roos' test. Imaging and electrodiagnostic testing would additionally help differentiate TOS from CuTS.

== Treatment ==
=== Nonoperative treatment ===
Initial management for CuTS focuses on conservative treatment, with goals to improve symptoms and functional use before proceeding to surgical intervention. A variety of these approaches include:

- Activity modification entails avoiding activities that apply direct pressure to the ulnar nerve or those that reduce elbow flexion.
- Elbow splints are designed to maintain a position of slight extension for the elbow joint. However, one study suggests that higher quality research needs to determine the efficacy of night splinting.
- For short-term relief, nonsteroidal anti-inflammatory drugs (NSAIDs) or corticosteroid injections may be considered.
- Physical therapy involves exercises that focus on reducing pressure within the cubital tunnel. Nerve gliding is an exercise that stretches the nerve to allow for more flexibility with joint movement. Additionally, strengthening the muscles surrounding the joint can help stabilize the ulnar nerve.
- Occupational therapy focuses on training exercises that assist the individual in performing activities of daily living and maintaining ergonomic posture.

=== Surgical treatment ===
If conservative management failed, surgical intervention would be the next step. Surgery could also be pursued initially based on symptom severity, with evidence such like weakness or muscle atrophy. Generally, there are two types of procedures, decompression versus transposition. Clinical improvement has been shown to be equivalent between the two techniques, with 87% of patients improving after surgery.

==== Surgical decompression ====
In the decompression procedure, the goal is to release the structures that apply pressure onto the ulnar nerve. Some of the removed structures include Osborne's ligament or any tissue compressing the nerve. It can be performed openly or endoscopically. This procedure is considered less invasive and preserves the original anatomic location of the ulnar nerve. Surgical decompression is associated with fewer complications and lower morbidity. compared to transposition; moreover, open techniques appear to be safer than endoscopic.

==== Surgical transposition ====
Transposition involves relocating the ulnar nerve to protect it from compression or friction. The nerve can be relocated subcutaneously, anterior to the medial epicondyle. This provides some laxity to the nerve, especially during elbow flexion. An alternate location would reposition the ulnar nerve beneath the forearm flexor and pronator muscles, thereby protecting it from compression and friction irritation. There is no evidence that submuscular or subcutaneous transposition is superior.; however, evidence suggests that transposition procedures are more hazardous than in-situ decompression.

== History ==
Cubital tunnel syndrome was first discussed by William Feindel and Joseph Stratford in 1958. Their article noted that prior research on ulnar nerve palsy did not examine the cubital tunnel as a site of nerve compression.

== See also ==
- Ulnar neuropathy at the elbow
- Nerve compression syndrome
- Carpal tunnel syndrome
