= Ulnar tunnel syndrome =

Disorder of the ulnar nerve at the wrist

- Other names: Guyon's canal syndrome
- Specialty: Orthopedic surgery

Ulnar tunnel syndrome, also known as Guyon canal syndrome or Handlebar palsy, is ulnar neuropathy at the wrist where it passes through the ulnar tunnel (the Guyon canal). The most common presentation is a palsy of the deep motor branch of the ulnar nerve manifesting as weakness of the interosseous muscles. Ulnar tunnel syndrome is usually caused by a ganglion cyst pressing on the ulnar nerve, but often the cause is unknown (idiopathic). Long-distance bicycle rides are associated with transient alterations in ulnar nerve function. Sensory loss in the ring and small fingers is usually due to ulnar nerve entrapment at the cubital tunnel near the elbow, which is known as cubital tunnel syndrome.

== Causes ==
Ulnar neuropathy at the wrist is often associated with a mass such as a ganglion cyst or thrombosis or an aneurysm of the ulnar artery. The role of activities and exposure is less certain.

== Diagnosis ==
=== Classification ===
Three locations (zones) in which the ulnar nerve can be compressed within Guyon canal

Ulnar tunnel syndrome may be characterized by the location or zone within Guyon's canal at which the ulnar nerve is compressed. The nerve divides into a superficial sensory branch and a deeper motor branch in this area. Thus, Guyon's canal can be separated into three zones based on which portion of the ulnar nerve is involved. The resulting syndrome results in either muscle weakness or impaired sensation in the ulnar distribution.

Zone	Location	Symptoms	Associations
1	Proximal (before ulnar nerve bifurcation)	Mixed motor & sensory	Ganglia & hook of hamate fractures
2	Surrounding the deep motor branch of the ulnar nerve	Motor only	Ganglia & hook of hamate fractures
3	Surrounding the superficial sensory branch of the ulnar nerve	Sensory only	Ulnar artery pathology

Zone 2 type syndromes are most common, while Zone 3 syndromes are least common.

== Treatment ==
The role of gloves to protect the ulnar nerve from compression is unclear. Palsy of the ulnar motor nerve isolated to the wrist is treated with operative decompression, often with concomitant ganglion excision. The surgery divides the volar carpal ligament, which forms the roof of Guyon's canal, thereby reducing compression on the ulnar nerve.

== See also ==
- Cubital tunnel syndrome
- Jean Casimir Félix Guyon
- Ulnar claw
