= Osborne's ligament =

Connective tissue in the body

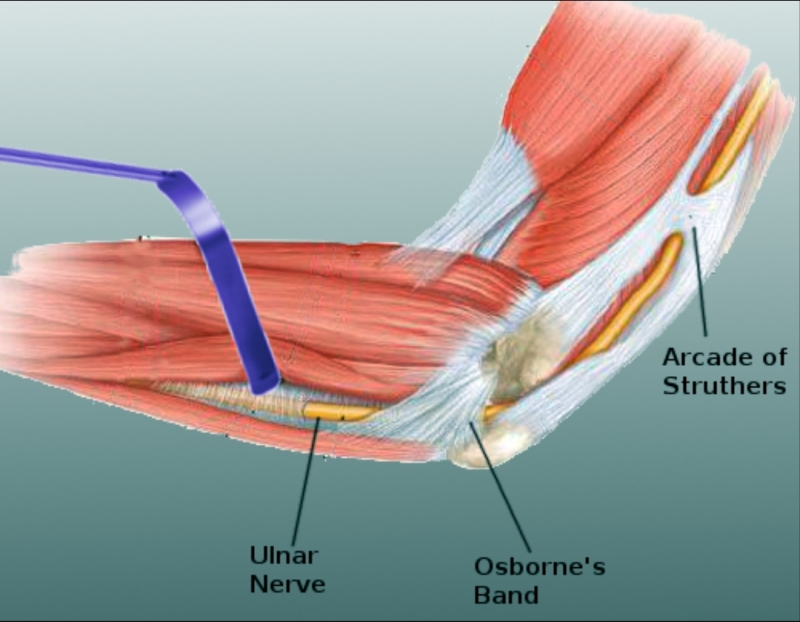

Details
- Synonym: Osborne's band, Osborne's fascia
- Location: Dorsal medial of the elbow

Identifiers
- FMA: 85450

Osborne's ligament, also Osborne's band, Osborne's fascia, Osborne's arcade, arcuate ligament of Osborne, or the cubital tunnel retinaculum, refers to either the connective tissue which spans the humeral and ulnar heads of the flexor carpi ulnaris (FCU) or another distinct tissue located between the olecranon process of the ulna and the medial epicondyle of the humerus. It is named after Geoffrey Vaughan Osborne, a British orthopedic surgeon, who described the eponymous tissue in 1957.

== Definition ==
Due to inconsistent definitions in the literature, Osborne's ligament can be classified as the fibrous band bridging the two heads of the FCU as originally described by Osborne or the ligamentous tissue connecting the olecranon and the medial epicondyle. Different terminologies have also been used to describe the tissues, including ligamentum epitrochleo-anconeum and epitrochleo-olecranal ligament, further contributing to the problem of clarifying the definitions.

== Structure ==
Under the first definition, Osborne's ligament is a band of fibrous tissue which connects the humeral and the ulnar heads of the FCU. It can be classified as being thin or thick and thought to be a separate structure from the aponeurosis of the FCU.

Under the second definition, Osborne's ligament is a ligamentous tissue with one end attached to the olecranon and the other to the medial epicondyle. It is generally believed to be analogous to the anatomically variant epitrochleoanconeus muscle which is attached to the olecranon and the medial epicondyle in the same manner, meaning that people possessing Osborne's ligament do not have the epitrochleoanconeus and vice versa. It can be categorized into two types:

- Type Ia: thin; lax when the elbow is extended and becomes taut when the elbow is flexed.
- Type Ib: thick; taut even when the elbow is not fully flexed (90°–120°).

Under both definitions, Osborne's ligament forms the roof of the cubital tunnel, an opening between the muscles through which the ulnar nerve passes.

== Prevalence ==
The prevalence of Osborne's ligament has been inconsistently reported, ranging from 8% through 77% to 100% in cadavers across different studies. The inconsistency can be attributed to the unestablished definition of the tissue.

== Clinical significance ==
Osborne's ligament can be visualized via ultrasound and MRI.

=== Cubital tunnel syndrome ===
One of the possible sites of ulnar nerve entrapment is the cubital tunnel which is where Osborne's ligament is located. When Osborne's ligament is present, the volume of the cubital tunnel decreases when the elbow is flexed. This contributes to chronic compression of the ulnar nerve which causes numbness and weakness in the fingers and can lead to intrinsic paralysis of the hand in untreated severe cases. Decompression of the ulnar nerve can be achieved through surgery. Alternatively, in mild cases of the entrapment, non-operative conservative treatment, which includes nerve gliding and wearing a splint at night, may be used to alleviate the nerve compression.

A scratch collapse test can be utilized to evaluate the condition as well as pinpoint the location of the nerve entrapment by Osborne's ligament. The test begins with the patient sitting with their elbow flexed at 90° and their fingers pointing toward the examiner. The examiner then rotates the patient's forearm medially or inward towards the patient's torso. The patient is asked to resist the motion, and the examiner gauges the resulting resistance. Following this, the examiner strokes the area on the patient's arm that is thought to be the site of impingement. The examiner then rotates the patient's forearm medially again. If there is a noticeable reduction in the resistance, the test's result is considered positive, and the stroked area is likely confirmed to be the site of the nerve entrapment.
