= Wartenberg's sign =

- Differential diagnosis: Ulnar nerve neuropathy, Cervical myelopathy

Wartenberg's sign is a neurological sign consisting of involuntary abduction of the fifth (little) finger, caused by unopposed action of the extensor digiti minimi.

This commonly results from weakness of some of the ulnar nerve innervated intrinsic hand muscles -in particular the palmar interosseous muscle to the little finger- caused by damage to their nerve supply (denervation). There may be different causes for this denervation and muscle imbalance including:

- An ulnar nerve neuropathy usually from ulnar nerve entrapment somewhere along its course (most commonly around the cubital tunnel at the elbow where the nerve is exposed to tension, friction and compression). This muscle imbalance between the (intact) radial nerve innervated extensor digiti quinti and the (weak) ulnar innervated interossei in the context of ulnar neuropathy is what Wartenberg described.
- Cervical myelopathy most commonly due to mechanical compression of the spinal cord in the neck as occurs in spondylotic cervical spinal stenosis but also seen in other spinal cord disease including post-traumatic tetraplegia. This finding of weak finger adduction in cervical myelopathy is also called the "finger escape sign".
- Upper motor neuron disorders of the cerebral cortex such as mild hemiplegic stroke or hemiplegic migraine where the same clinical finding has been called the "digiti quinti sign"

Differentiation of the cause of Wartenberg's sign is based on associated clinical findings in the history and examination and sometimes involves investigations including radiographs and/or MRI of the cervical spine, elbow/wrist/hand and/or nerve conduction studies and EMG.

Wartenberg's sign is not a feature of, and should not be confused with, Wartenberg's syndrome. The latter involves compression at the wrist of the superficial sensory branch of the radial nerve which does not innervate hand muscles.

Robert Wartenberg (1887-1956) was a neurologist born in Belarus who worked in Germany until 1935 when he emigrated to the United States. He was widely published and described a number of neurological signs and clinical tests.
