= Ulnar neuropathy at the elbow =

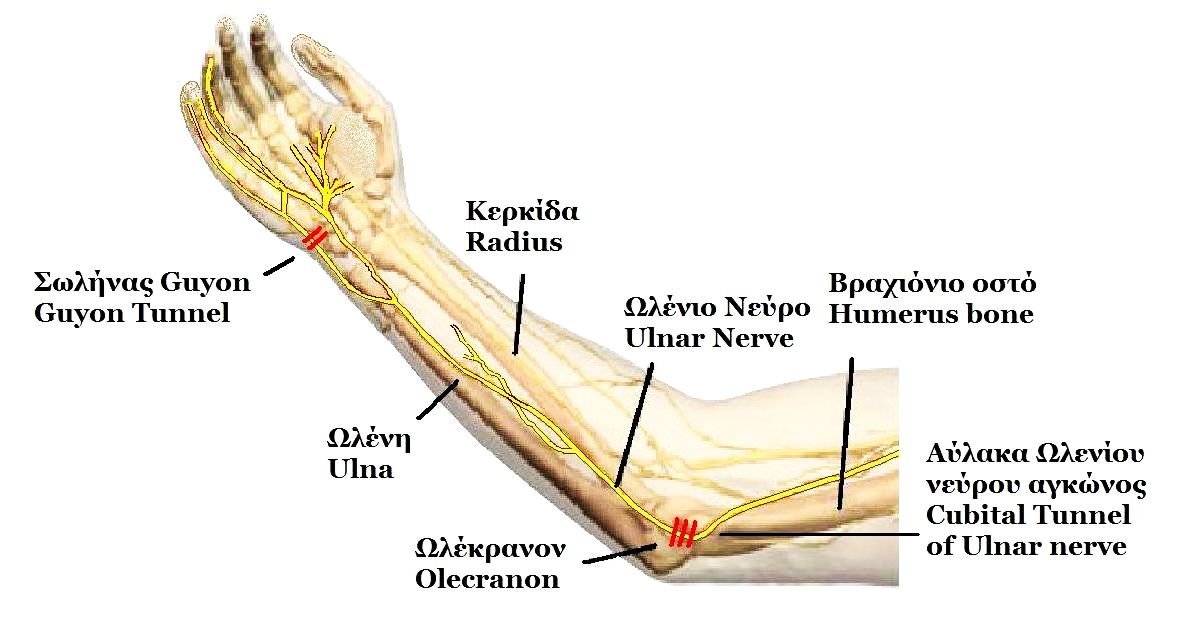
- Anatomy of the ulnar nerve
- Specialty: Neurology

Idiopathic ulnar neuropathy at the elbow is a condition where pressure on the ulnar nerve as it passes through the cubital tunnel causes ulnar neuropathy. The symptoms of neuropathy are paresthesia (tingling) and numbness (loss of sensation) primarily affecting the little finger and ring finger of the hand. Ulnar neuropathy can progress to weakness and atrophy of the muscles in the hand (interossei and small and ring finger lumbrical). Symptoms can be alleviated by using a splint to prevent the elbow from flexing while sleeping.

== Signs and symptoms ==
In general, ulnar neuropathy will result in symptoms in a specific anatomic distribution, affecting the little finger, the ulnar half of the ring finger, and the intrinsic muscles of the hand.

The specific symptoms experienced in the characteristic distribution depend on the specific location of ulnar nerve compression. The hallmark symptom of ulnar neuropathy at the elbow (cubital tunnel syndrome) is paresthesia (tingling). This can progress to a loss of sensibility. Muscle weakness is usually experienced as a loss of dexterity.

Ulnar tunnel syndrome (ulnar neuropathy at the wrist) is associated with variable symptoms, as the ulnar nerve separates near the hand into distinct motor and sensory branches.

In cubital tunnel syndrome (ulnar neuropathy at the elbow), sensory and motor symptoms tend to occur in a certain sequence. Initially, there may be intermittent paresthesia and loss of sensibility of the small and ulnar half of the ring fingers. Next is constant numbness (loss of sensibility). The final stage is intrinsic hand muscle atrophy and weakness.

In contrast, when ulnar neuropathy occurs at the wrist (ulnar tunnel syndrome), motor symptoms predominate. There may be an ulnar claw hand from an imbalance between the muscles innervated by the ulnar nerve in the forearm (which are functioning normally) and those in the hand (which are weak). The back of the hand will have normal sensation.

== Diagnosis ==
Ulnar neuropathy at the cubital tunnel is diagnosed based on characteristic symptoms and signs. Intermittent or static numbness in the small finger and ulnar half of the ring finger, weakness or atrophy of the first dorsal interosseous, positive Tinel sign over the ulnar nerve proximal to the cubital tunnel, and positive elbow flexion test (elicitation of paresthesia in the small and ring finger with sustained elbow flexion) establish the diagnosis. The diagnosis can be confirmed using electrophysiological tests: nerve conduction velocity and electromyography.

Imaging studies are not routinely used. Ultrasound or MRI may reveal enlargement of the ulnar nerve proximal to the cubital tunnel. Variations in anatomy such as the anconeus epitrochlearis muscle are common and their relationship to ulnar neuropathy is uncertain.

=== Differential diagnosis ===
Trauma can cause symptoms of ulnar neuropathy. The symptoms are transient after blunt trauma and constant after a laceration.

It is theorized that dislocation of the ulnar nerve anteriorly over the medial epicondyle can result in ulnar neuropathy, but this is not established by experimental evidence.

Ulnar nerve dislocation is a common variation of normal and has not been experimentally associated with ulnar neuropathy.

Median neuropathy at the carpal tunnel (the symptoms of which are carpal tunnel syndrome) is typically characterized by numbness in the thumb, index, middle, and half of the ring finger. Since there is a variable crossover between the median and ulnar nerves, as well as the patient's imprecise experience and report of the symptoms, median neuropathy at the carpal tunnel can be considered among people with intermittent paresthesia of the small and ring fingers.

=== Classification ===
McGowan classified idiopathic ulnar neuropathy at the elbow as follows: i) Mild (intermittent paresthesia); ii) moderate (intermittent paresthesia and measurable weakness); and iii) severe (constant paresthesia and measurable weakness).

Dellon and Goldberg modified the classification to subdivide grade 2 neuropathy into grade 2A and 2B based on the extent of motor compromise. The modified classification is as follows: Type 1 Subjective sensory symptoms without objective loss of two-point sensibility or muscular atrophy; Type 2A Sensory symptoms and weakness on pinch and grip without atrophy of intrinsic muscles; Type 2B Sensory symptoms and atrophy and intrinsic muscle strength less than 3 out of 5 on the Medical Research Council scale; Type 3 Profound muscular atrophy and sensory disturbance.

=== Pathoanatomy ===
The most common location of ulnar nerve compression at the elbow is within the cubital tunnel. The symptoms and signs associated with this pathophysiology are known as cubital tunnel syndrome. The tunnel is formed by the medial epicondyle of the humerus, the olecranon process of the ulna and the tendinous arch joining the humeral and ulnar heads of the flexor carpi ulnaris muscle (the cubital tunnel retinaculum; aka Osborne ligament).

==== Cause ====
Compression of the ulnar nerve at the medial elbow may occur with an epitrocheloanconeus muscle, an anatomical variant. Since most idiopathic ulnar neuropathy is not associated with this muscle variant, we don't know if there is any causal relationship.

=== Ulnar tunnel syndrome ===
Ulnar nerve impingement along an anatomical space in the wrist called the ulnar canal is known as ulnar tunnel syndrome (or Guyon canal's syndrome). Recognized causes of ulnar nerve impingement at this location include local trauma, fractures, ganglion cysts, and classically avid cyclists who experience repetitive trauma against bicycle handlebars. This form of ulnar neuropathy comprises two work-related syndromes: so-called "hypothenar hammer syndrome," seen in workers who repetitively use a hammer, and "occupational neuritis" due to hard, repetitive compression against a desk surface. This syndrome can be categorized into three zones based on the localization of the ulnar nerve within the Guyon's canal.

== Prevention ==
Cubital tunnel syndrome can be prevented or reduced by maintaining good posture and using the elbow and arms properly. Wearing an arm splint while sleeping to maintain the arm in a straight position rather than keeping the elbow tightly bent may improve symptoms. A recent example of this is popularization of the concept of cell phone elbow and game hand.

== Treatment ==
The most effective treatment for cubital tunnel syndrome is surgical nerve decompression. The most safe and effective operation is in-situ decompression +/- medial epicondylectomy.

Mild symptoms may first be treated non-operatively, with the following:

- Elbow joint immobilization in extension at night +/- during the day
- Neural flossing/gliding exercises
- Strengthening/stretching exercises
- Activity modification (e.g., avoidance of pressure on the elbows)

It is crucial to identify positions and activities that aggravate symptoms and to find ways to avoid them. For example, if the person experiences symptoms when holding a telephone up to the head, then the use of a telephone headset will provide immediate symptomatic relief and reduce the likelihood of further damage and inflammation to the nerve. For cubital tunnel syndrome, it is recommended to avoid repetitive elbow flexion and also avoid prolonged elbow flexion during sleep, as this position puts stress on the ulnar nerve.

Cubital tunnel decompression surgery involves an incision posteromedial to the medial epicondyle, which helps avoid the medial antebrachial cutaneous nerve branches. The ulnar nerve is identified and released from its fascia proximally and distally up to the flexor carpi ulnaris heads. After release, flexion and extension of the arm are performed to ensure there is no subluxation of the ulnar nerve.

== Prognosis ==
Following surgery, on average, 85% of patients report an improvement in their symptoms

Most patients diagnosed with cubital tunnel syndrome have advanced disease (atrophy, static numbness, weakness) that might reflect permanent nerve damage that will not recover after surgery. When diagnosed before atrophy, weakness or static numbness, the disease can be arrested with treatment. Mild and intermittent symptoms often resolve on their own.

== Epidemiology ==
People with diabetes mellitus are at higher risk for any kind of peripheral neuropathy, including ulnar nerve entrapments.

Cubital tunnel syndrome is more common in people who spend long periods with their elbows bent, such as when holding a telephone to their head. Flexing the elbow while the arm is pressed against a hard surface, such as leaning against the edge of a table, is a significant risk factor. The use of vibrating tools at work or other causes of repetitive activities increase the risk, including throwing a baseball.

Damage to or deformity of the elbow joint increases the risk of cubital tunnel syndrome. Additionally, people who have other nerve entrapments elsewhere in the arm and shoulder are at higher risk for ulnar nerve entrapment. There is some evidence that soft tissue compression of the nerve pathway in the shoulder by a bra strap over many years can cause symptoms of ulnar neuropathy, especially in very large-breasted women.

== See also ==
- Cervical vertebrae
- Ulnar neuropathy
- Ulnar tunnel syndrome
- Ulnar nerve
- Cubital tunnel
- Nerve compression syndrome
- Carpal tunnel syndrome
- Cervical radiculopathy
