= Trochlea of humerus =

Structure of the elbow joint

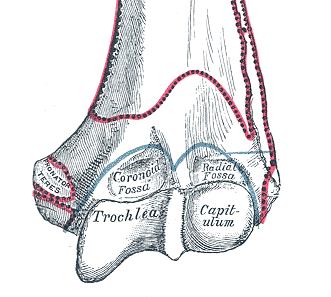
- Anterior view of distal part of left humerus

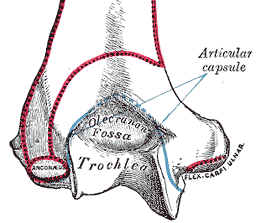
- Posterior view of distal part of left humerus

Details

Identifiers
- Latin: trochlea humeri
- TA98: A02.4.04.023
- TA2: 1203
- FMA: 23370

In the human arm, the humeral trochlea is the medial portion of the articular surface of the elbow joint which articulates with the trochlear notch on the ulna in the forearm.

== Structure ==
In humans and other apes, it is trochleariform (or trochleiform), meaning it is shaped like a compound pulley. This is converse to the trochlea of most monkeys, which are cylindrical, and those of some prosimians, which are conical. It presents a deep depression between two well-marked borders; it is convex from before backward, concave from side to side, and occupies the anterior, lower, and posterior parts of the extremity.

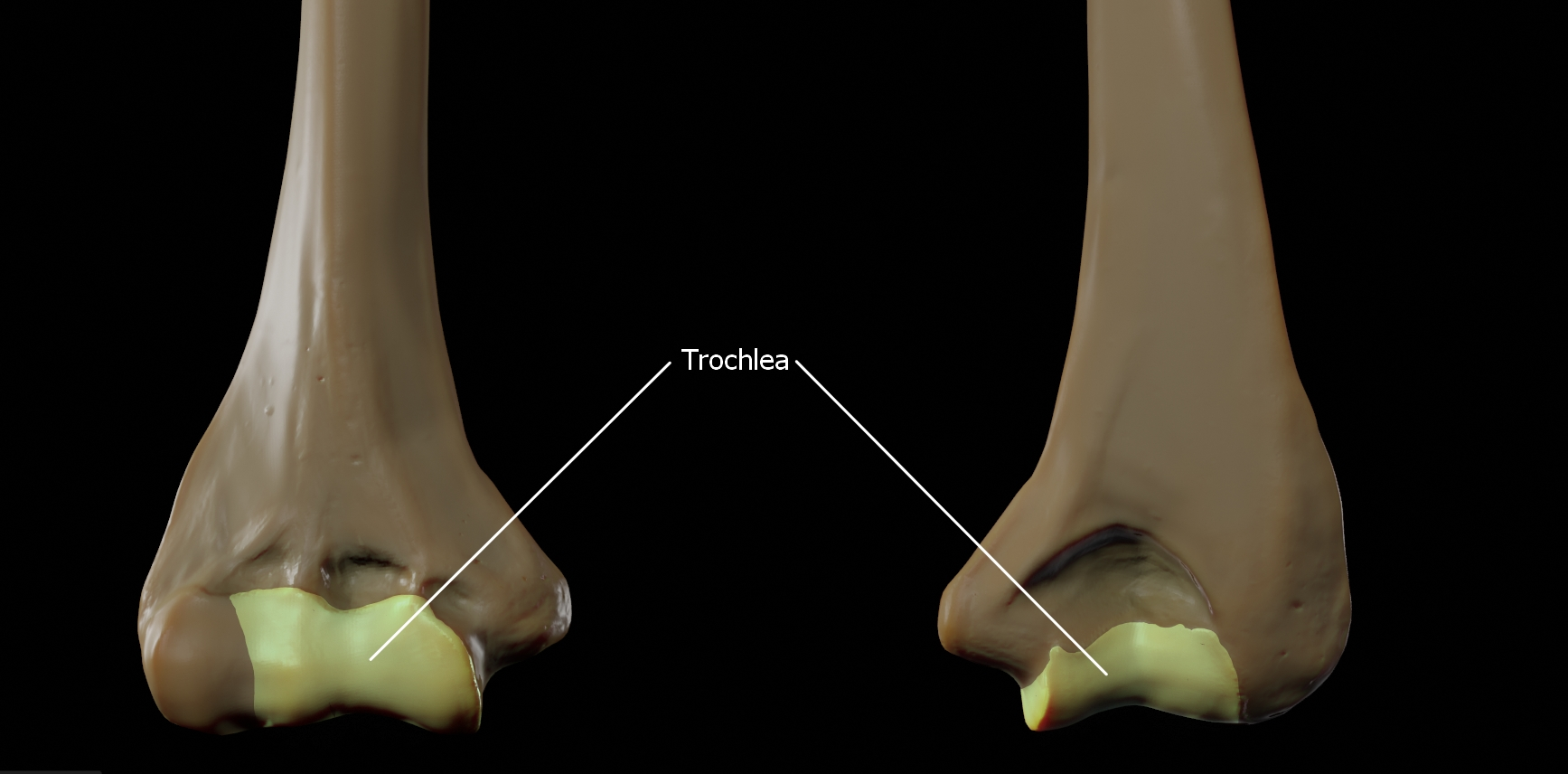
Trochlea of humerus

The trochlea has the capitulum located on its lateral side and the medial epicondyle on its medial. It is directly inferior to the coronoid fossa anteriorly and to the olecranon fossa posteriorly. In humans, these two fossae, the most prominent in the humerus, are occasionally transformed into a hole, the supratrochlear foramen, which is regularly present in, for example, dogs.

=== Carrying angle ===
When viewed from in front or behind, the trochlea looks roughly cylindrical, but when viewed from below its true oblique shape and the spiralling nature of its groove become apparent. The spiralling nature of the trochlear groove results in the varying transverse axes of the elbow joint.

Most frequently, the groove is vertical on the anterior side but runs down laterally on the posterior side. During elbow flexion, the vertical anterior part of the trochlea keeps the upper arm and forearm aligned (when viewed in front). During elbow extension, however, the oblique posterior part makes contact with the trochlear notch on the ulna so that this obliquity forces the main axis of the forearm to form a small angle with that of the upper arm. This angle is known as the carrying angle and is more prominent in women than in men.

Less frequently, the anterior part is oblique too, but in the opposite direction of the posterior side. Consequently, during full elbow flexion, the hand tends to rest outside the shoulder. Very rarely, the anterior part is oblique in the opposite direction, resulting in the hand's resting on the chest during flexion.

== Function ==
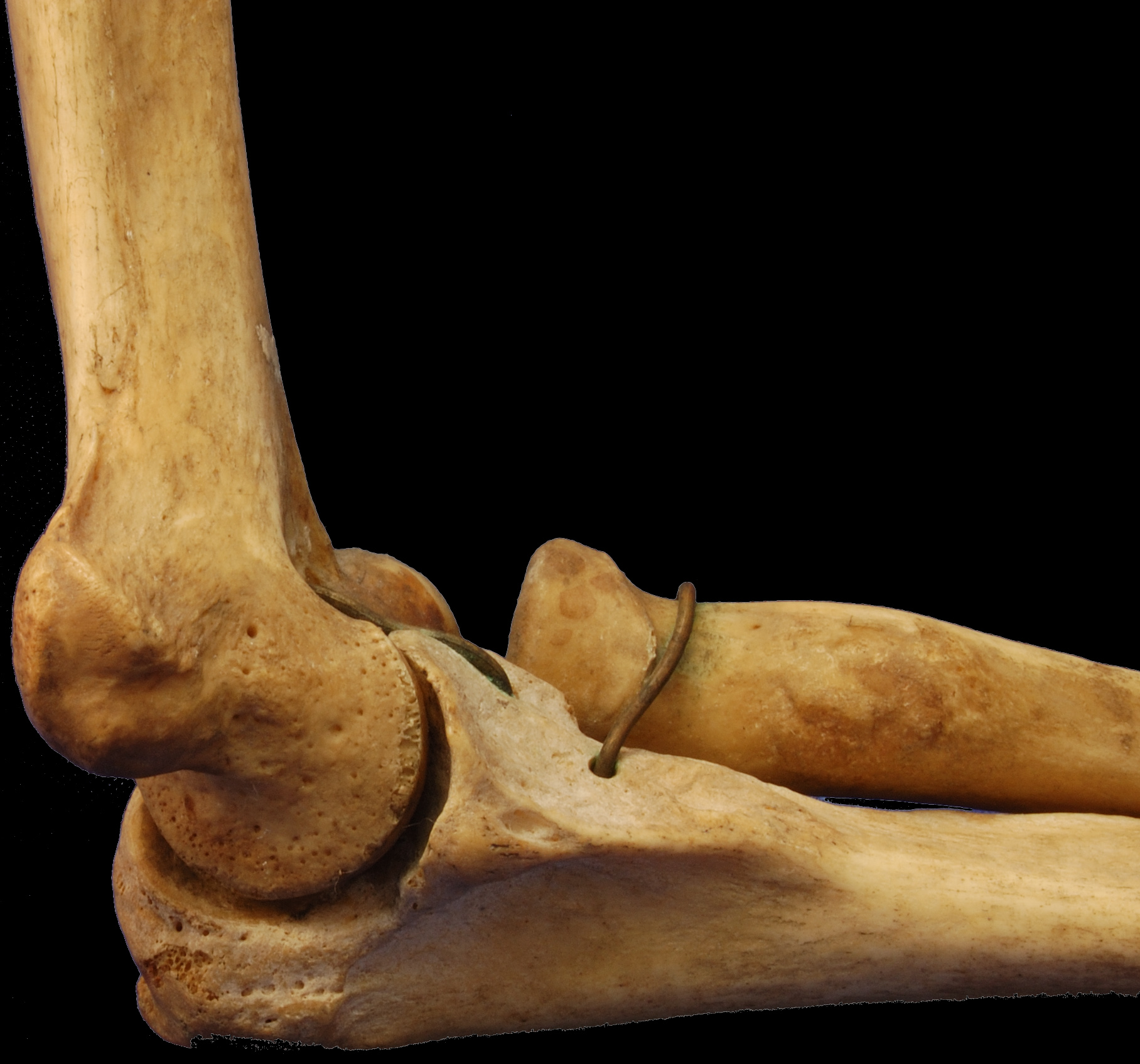
The trochlea articulated with the trochlear notch and coronoid

The elbow is a hinge joint with a rotatory component where the trochlea forms the convex, proximal surface which articulates with the concave, distal surface on the ulna, the trochlear notch. While the trochlea together with its associated fossae almost covers a 360° angle, the trochlear notch on the ulna forms a 190° arc and the gap in between allows flexion and extension at the elbow. Maximum elbow flexion and extension is made possible because the two fossae accommodates to coronoid and olecranon processes.

== Ossification ==
While the ossification of the capitulum has started a year after birth, the ossification of the trochlea begins at 8–9 years of age; that of the head of radius and the medial epicondyle at 4–5 years and that of the lateral condyle at 10 years.

== Additional images ==
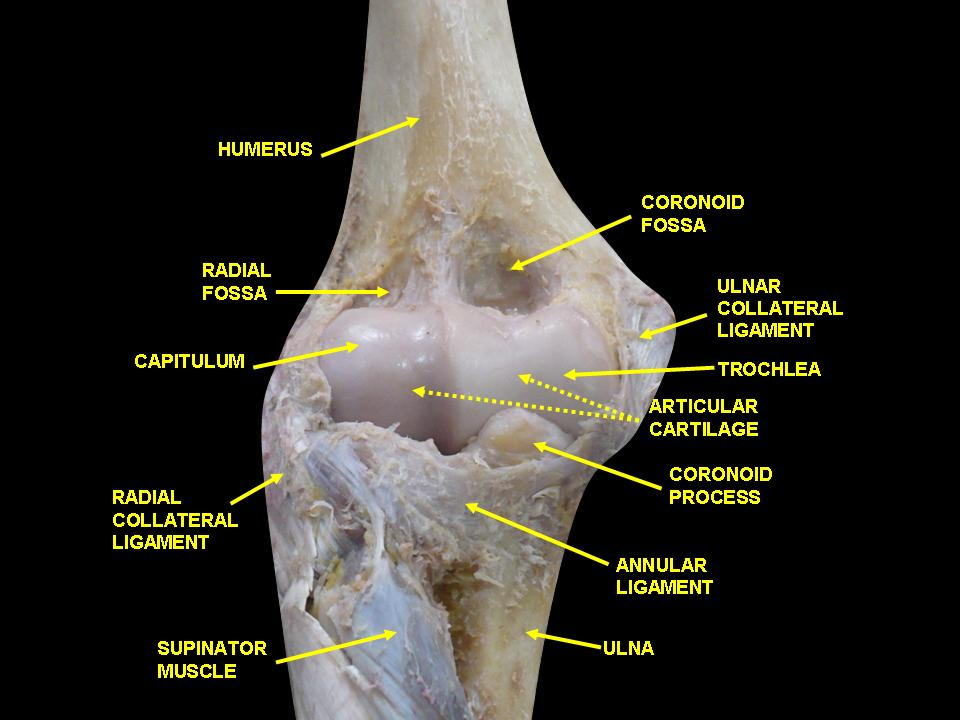
Elbow joint. Deep dissection. Anterior view.

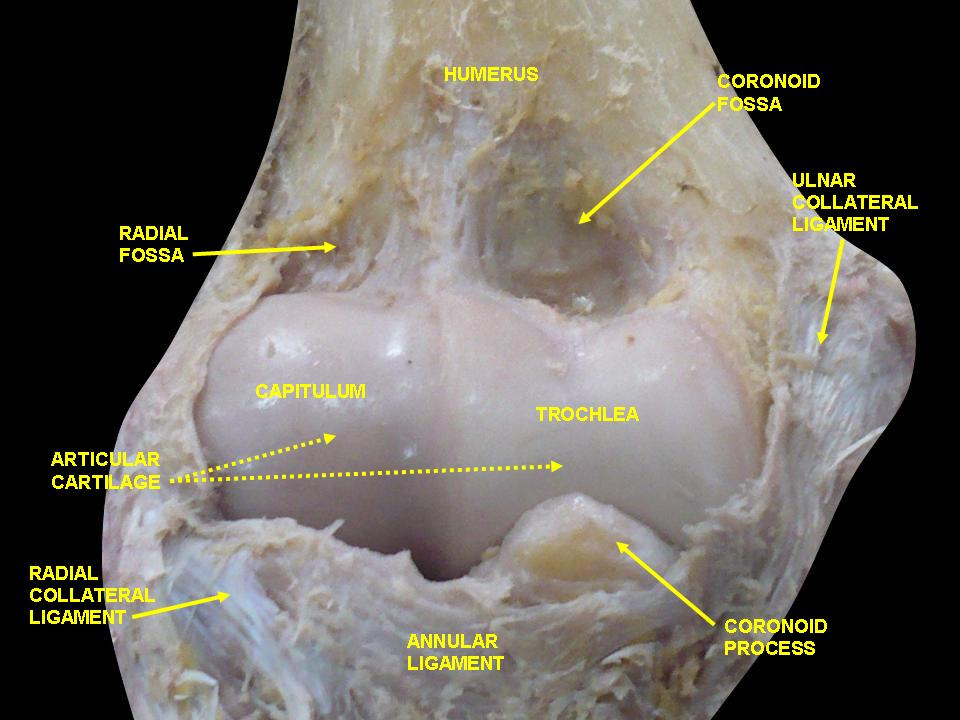
Elbow joint. Deep dissection. Anterior view.
