= Trochlear notch =

Large depression in the upper extremity of the ulna forming part of the elbow joint

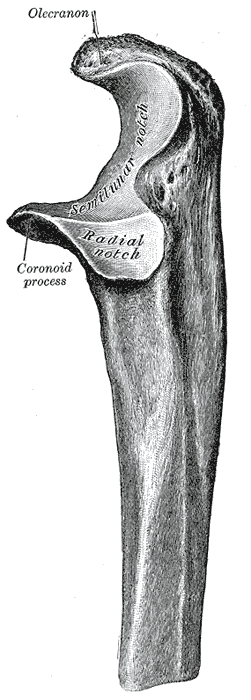
- Upper extremity of left ulna. Lateral aspect. (Semilunar notch visible at center top.)

Details

Identifiers
- Latin: incisura trochlearis ulnae, incisura semilunaris ulnae
- TA98: A02.4.06.006
- TA2: 1235
- FMA: 23619

The trochlear notch (/ˈtrɒklɪər/), also known as semilunar notch and greater sigmoid cavity, is a large depression in the upper extremity of the ulna that fits the trochlea of the humerus (the bone directly above the ulna in the arm) as part of the elbow joint. It is formed by the olecranon and the coronoid process.

About the middle of either side of this notch is an indentation, which contracts it somewhat, and indicates the junction of the olecranon and the coronoid process.

The notch is concave from above downward, and divided into a medial and a lateral portion by a smooth ridge running from the summit of the olecranon to the tip of the coronoid process.

The medial portion is the larger, and is slightly concave transversely; the lateral is convex above, slightly concave below.
