= Nerve glide =

Physical therapy exercise

Nerve gliding, also known as nerve flossing, is an exercise intended to improve the movement of peripheral nerves relative to surrounding tissues as the joints move. Nerve gliding is impeded by injuries or inflammation as the nerve is trapped by the tissue surrounding the nerve near the joint. Thus, nerve gliding exercises are widely used in rehabilitation programs and during the post-surgical period.

Radial, median, sciatic, and ulnar nerves require nerve gliding exercises during the rehabilitation period. The most common conditions treated are carpal tunnel syndrome, cubital tunnel syndrome, and radial neuropathy. Therapists diagnose the symptoms and prescribe the relevant nerve gliding exercises. Patients feel less pain when nerves can stretch, and there should be no aggressive exercise. Nerve gliding exercises should be done several times daily, depending on the issue. As patients continuously do the exercises, they start to feel less pain after a few weeks.

== Research ==
=== Carpal tunnel syndrome ===
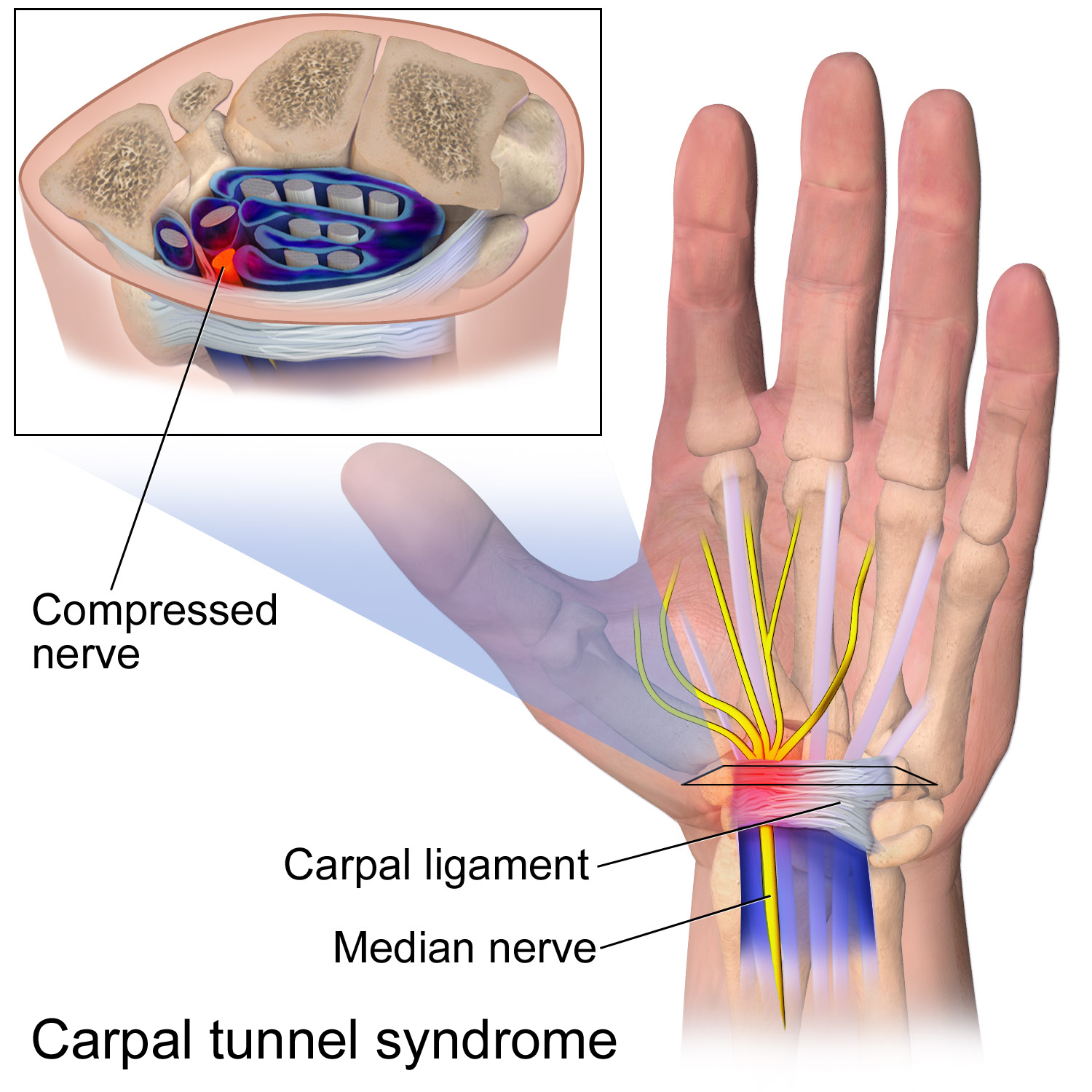
Carpal Tunnel Syndrome, symptoms of carpal tunnel syndrome and anatomical location of the affected region.

Carpal tunnel syndrome (CTS) causes pain when the median nerve passes through the carpal tunnel in the wrist. It occurs when median nerves get irritated or compressed. CTS evokes symptoms, including pain, paresthesia, and muscle atrophy. This further leads to chronic pain and economic difficulties for patients as it requires work absence and surgical treatment.

Nerve gliding exercises are one of the optimal carpal tunnel syndrome treatments. Restoring smooth nerve movement helps to relieve edema and reduce adhesions in the carpal tunnel. According to the research, nerve gliding exercises reduce pain, decrease sensitive distal latency, and improve the functions that require grip force. However, inappropriate nerve gliding exercises can worsen the condition. Neural mobilization via nerve gliding should avoid excessive median nerve stretching when extending fingers in wrist extensions or when otherwise not advised.

Nerve gliding exercises are not optimal for every patient. There is limited evidence on the effectiveness of neural gliding. However, the addition of nerve gliding exercises in conservative care accelerate the rehabilitation process and avoid surgical treatment. Further research is required to study the effectiveness of nerve glide physiotherapy and to determine groups that tend to respond better.

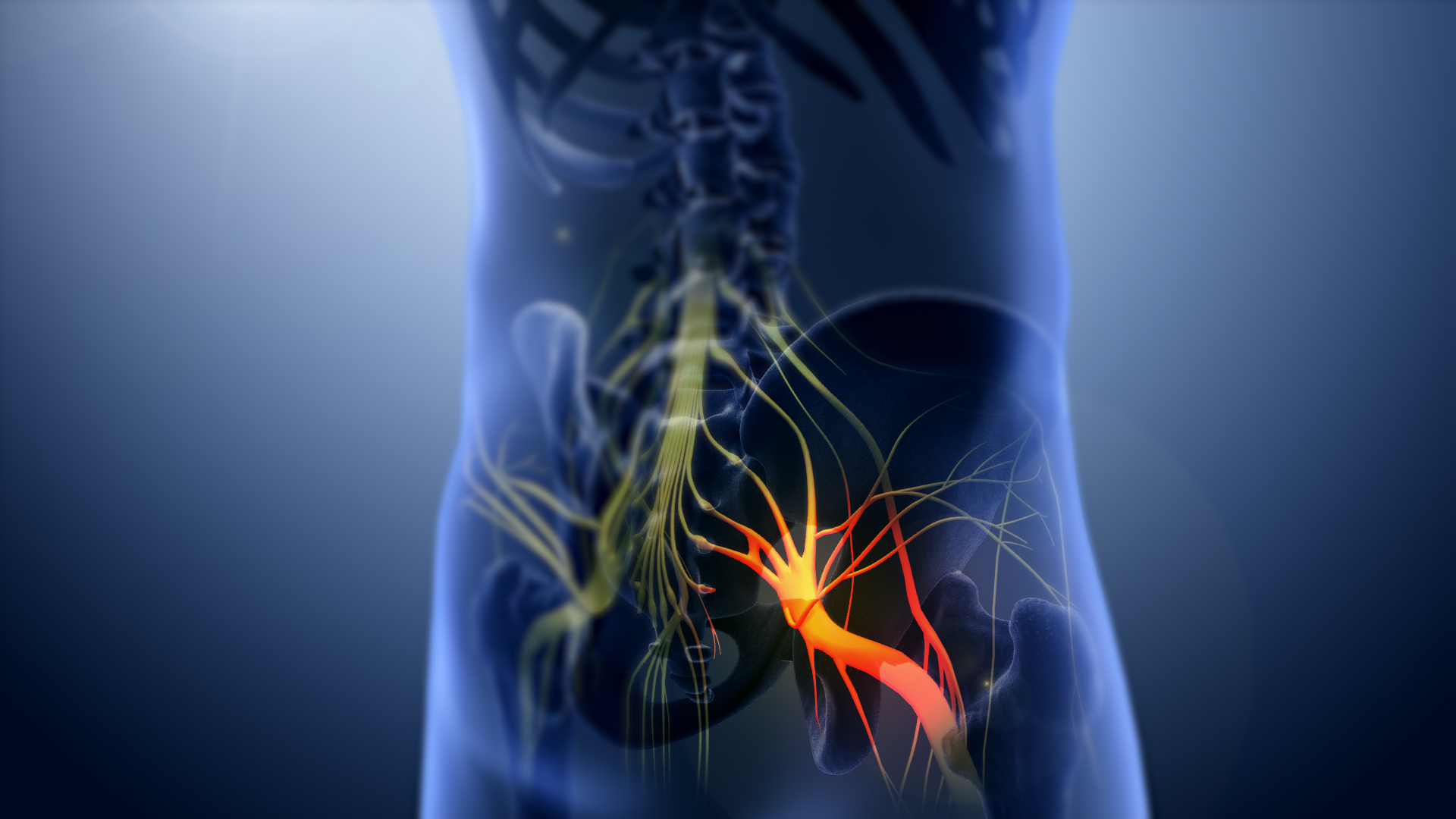
Low back pain caused by compression of the sciatic nerve

=== Acute sciatica and hip range of motion ===
Sciatica is low back pain that can extend to the feet. This nerve pain is caused by nerve root irritation or constriction. Nerve glides are a common option for sciatica due to their cost-effectiveness. After performing nerve glides, the Numeric Pain Rating Score (NPRS) rated by patients improved, indicating a reduction in the pain. The nerve glide reduces acute sciatica and improves the range of motion of the hip. When nerve glides were performed along with other therapies, it resulted in a greater reduction in pain. However, the research indicates that there is no statistically significant difference in the results among patients who were treated with nerve glides and other conventional treatments.

=== Neck and arm pain ===
Neural gliding is used for the rehabilitation of nerve-related neck and arm pain. The pain initiates from the neck, expanding to the arm. Nerve gliding physical therapy is beneficial in reducing pain intensity, bringing short-term improvements. This treatment was found to manage neural tissue through specific postures and movements of the parts in pain. The stretch reduces nerve mechanosensitivity and relieves discomfort, eventually leading to the normal function of the body. However, the long-term effects of nerve gliding exercises still remains unclear.

=== Cubital tunnel syndrome ===
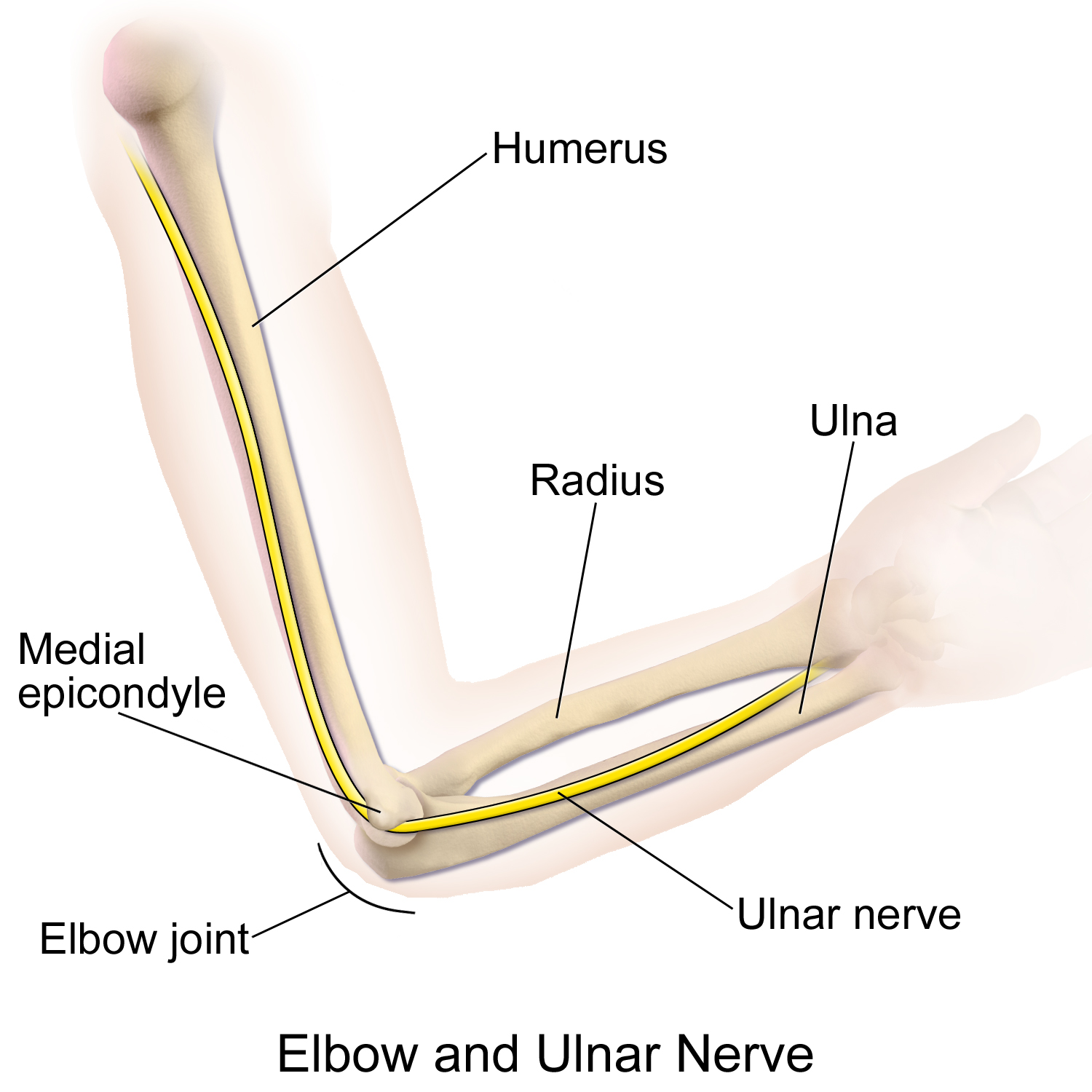
Anatomical location of ulnar nerve, the affected area of the cubital tunnel syndrome.

Cubital tunnel syndrome is a condition that can cause pain when the ulnar nerves are stretched, pressed, or irritated. This syndrome is also known as "ulnar nerve entrapment". Similar to carpal tunnel syndrome, cubital tunnel syndrome can cause pain, numbness, tingling, or weakness in the hand. Patients with cubital tunnel syndrome may experience loss of grip strength and weakness in the affected hand. The ulnar nerve passes through the cubital tunnel in the elbow. Irritation or injuries at the elbow can lead to cubital tunnel syndrome.

Ulnar nerve gliding is recommended to reduce the symptoms of cubital tunnel syndrome. Patients with ulnar nerve gliding should avoid the static holding position. Rather, patients should repeat nerve gliding with the range of movement. There are various ulnar nerve gliding methods, which include elbow flexion, wrist extension, head tilt, and arm flexion.

== Comparisons ==
=== Static stretching and dynamic stretching ===
Nerve gliding can reduce and strengthen connective tissues resulting in increased hamstring extensibility and passive stiffness. Passive stiffness refers to the resistance elongation that occurs in the joint, tendons, and connective tissues. The acute increase in hamstring extensibility can be seen right after nerve gliding intervention at the maximum range of motion. Nerve glide intervention is found to be slightly more effective than static stretching. The absolute static nerve extensibility was five times greater than the static stretching. While nerve gliding enhances the ability of the hamstring to stretch, the static stretch is more effective in terms of stress relaxation. Unlike static stretching, dynamic stretching shows similar outcomes to nerve gliding exercise. For hamstring flexibility, dynamic stretching targets low extremity muscles, while nerve gliding exercise targets posterior low extremity muscles and neural structures. Although both nerve gliding exercises and dynamic stretching do not lead to huge changes in exercise performance, both stretching methods are essential for pre-exercise stretches to avoid injuries.

=== Comparison with laser treatment ===
An alternative treatment option for carpal tunnel syndrome is low-level laser therapy (LLLT). The research shows that there is a statistically significant improvement in both LLLT and nerve gliding exercises. However, the difference in the effectiveness of LLLT and nerve gliding is not considered to replace nerve gliding physiotherapy. Considering the feasibility of those two treatments in terms of machine availability and cost-effectiveness, nerve gliding exercise remains to be prescribed widely.

== Precaution ==
The injured or entrapped nerves are sensitive to external stimuli. Thus, nerve gliding, or nerve flossing, must be stopped, or range of motion (ROM) must be reduced once the patient feels pain. Patients' pain must be checked to avoid further irritation and injuries. Continuous nerve gliding enhances the movement of the joints and faster rehabilitation. If there is no further progress in rehabilitation, patients must see doctors or therapists for correct diagnosis. Nerve gliding exercises are not recommended for acute symptoms and severe damage. They can pull on the nerve roots, thus worsening symptoms and nerve irritation.

When a nerve glide is performed by injured athletes, it has been shown to have no side effects on their sports performance. The measurements of sports performance include bilateral hamstring flexibility, vertical jump height, shuttle run, and dash sprint. This physiotherapy is safe when performed with caution (not going through the pains). Sports athletes can incorporate nerve glides in warm-up sessions.
