= Robert Wartenberg =

American neurologist (1887–1956)

- Born: June 19, 1887; Grodno, Russian Empire
- Died: November 16, 1956; San Francisco, U.S.A.
- Education: Kiel University; Ludwig-Maximilians-Universität München; University of Freiburg; University of Rostock
- Known for: Contributions to clinical neurology, namesake of the Wartenberg wheel
- Spouse: Baroness Isabelle von Sazenhofen (m. 1929)
- Scientific career
- Fields: Neurology
- Workplaces: University of Freiburg; University of California, San Francisco

Robert Wartenberg (June 19, 1887 – November 16, 1956) was a clinical neurologist and professor.

Born in the then-Russian Empire, he attended university and established his career in Germany. As a Jew, he was fired from his position as the University of Freiburg's Clinical Department of Neurology during the Nazi regime. He immigrated to the US, settling in San Francisco and teaching at the University of California, San Francisco.

He authored more than 150 papers and four books and made many significant discoveries in the area of clinical signs of neurological conditions. He continues to be commemorated by the American Academy of Neurology's annual Robert Wartenberg Lecture and by many eponyms in the field of neurology.

== Early life and education ==
Wartenberg was born in 1887 in Grodno, Belarus, then in the Russian Empire.

He studied at Kiel University, the Ludwig-Maximilians-Universität München, and the University of Freiburg, eventually graduating magna cum laude from the University of Rostock, Germany in 1919. He worked with Max Nonne in Hamburg and Otfrid Foerster in Breslau.

Wartenberg became a Travelling Fellow of the Rockefeller Foundation from 1925 to 1926, visiting the U.S., U.K., and France. During this time, he worked for Harvey Cushing in Boston.

== Career ==
Following his graduation, Wartenberg worked for a series of German universities. In the early 1930s, he became head of the neurological clinic and professor in neurology and psychiatry at the University of Freiburg. As a Jew, Wartenberg was persecuted by the Nazi regime. He was removed from the position at the University of Freiburg's Clinical Department of Neurology due to the Nazi Law for the Restoration of the Professional Civil Service. Wartenberg left Nazi Germany as a refugee in 1935 or 1936.

He settled in San Francisco and began working for the University of California, San Francisco in 1936. He was made clinical professor of neurology in 1952 and eventually became head of the Neurology Department.

Over his career, Wartenberg authored more than 150 papers and four books. His first book, "Examination of Reflexes," was translated into at least six languages. He submitted his final book to his publisher two hours before his death.

Wartenberg helped found the American Academy of Neurology, and served on the editorial boards of Confina Neurologica and The Journal of Nervous and Mental Disease.

Among his colleagues, he was considered to be a harsh, detail-oriented reviewer of his peers' writing. One of his colleagues stated of him that "The perfectionist drive led him at times into trouble, for he became notorious as a trenchant and hypercritical reviewer whose strictures often caused serious offence. This was quite an unfortunate trait, for his verbal violence was really quite at variance with his warm and generous personality." The same colleague described him as an excellent teacher, an opinion shared by Wartenberg's students.

Wartenberg was an honorary member of neurological societies in Spain, Italy, Germany, Austria, Brazil, and Argentina. He also helped found the American Academy of Neurology. During his career, he served on dozens of medical school academic search committees. He also sat of the editorial boards of Confina Neurologica and The Journal of Nervous and Mental Disease.

The Journal of Nervous and Mental Disease published a festschrift in honor of his 65th birthday titled "Neurological Problems in the World of 1953," and the American Academy of Neurology (AAN) awards an annual Robert Wartenberg Lecture in Wartenberg's honor. According to the According to the AAN's website, "The Robert Wartenberg Lecture Award is awarded to a neurologist for excellence in clinically relevant research."

== Discoveries ==
Although Wartenberg participated in the early development of encephalography and myelography, he tended to favor clinical examinations and most of his accomplishments involved the identification new reflexes and signs that could be used to diagnose neurological problems from clinical examination of a patient. These included such signs as:

- A way to diagnose neurological diseases, including Parkinson's disease, by observing how a patient swings their legs when seated on the examining table;
- The tendon palpation test, in which a lesion in a patient's lower motor neurons can be detected from the softness of their Achilles tendon when standing;
- The lid vibration test, in which detects early signs of facial palsy (or the final signs near the end of recover from it) from eyelid movement; and
- The accessory nerve test in which damage to a nerve along the trapezius is revealed by examining whether the patient's fingers hang lower on one side than the other when the patient is standing.

He was also the first person to identify Cheiralgia paresthetica, also known as handcuff neuropathy or as Wartenberg’s syndrome.

== Eponyms ==
During his career, Wartenberg worked to replace eponymous neurological terms with more descriptive names. However, he is now commemorated with several eponyms. These include Wartenberg's migratory sensory neuropathy, Wartenberg's sign, Wartenberg’s syndrome, and the Wartenberg wheel. Wartenberg is sometimes incorrectly credited as the inventor of the Wartenberg wheel.. According to Wartenberg, this device, used to test skin sensitivity, was in widespread use in Europe when he lived in Germany. While he did not invent it, he found it "an indispensable part of the outfit for everyday neurologic practice," and recommended its use to his colleagues in the US.

== Personal life ==
Wartenberg was born June 19, 1887.

In 1929, he married Baroness Isabelle von Sazenhofen. After establishing his career in Germany, he left due to persecution by the Nazi regime and reestablished his career in San Francisco, California, USA.

He eventually retired in 1954, to the status of emeritus professor of neurology.

Following a period of poor health in his final years, Wartenberg died of a "heart ailment" at Herbert C. Moffitt Hospital on Nov. 16, 1956 at age 69. He was survived by his wife and his father-in-law, Baron Karl von Sazenhofen, with whom he lived.

== Selected publications ==
- Wartenberg, R. (1932). "Cheiralgia paraesthetica.(Isolierte neuritis des Ramus superficialis nervi radialis.)" (PDF). Zeitschrift für die gesamte Neurologie und Psychiatrie (in German). 141 (1): 145–155. doi:10.1007/BF02909851. S2CID 71092059.
- Wartenberg, R. (1945). Examination of Reflexes A Simplification. Chicago: Year Book Publishers, Incorporated.
- Wartenberg, Robert (1952). Hemifacial Spasm A Clinical and Pathophysiological Study. Oxford University Press.
- Wartenberg, Robert (1953). Diagnostic Tests in Neurology: A Selection for Office Use. Year Book Publishers. ISBN 0598523138.
- Wartenberg, Robert (1958). Neuritis, sensory neuritis, neuralgia: a clinical study with review of the literature. Oxford University Press.

== See also ==
- Wartenberg's disease (syn.: Cheiralgia paresthetica): A sensitive neuropathy involving the superficial branch of the radial nerve.
- Wartenberg's sign: In ulnar paralysis the little finger is in a position of abduction.
- Wartenberg's syndrome: Radial nerve entrapment at the forearm.
- Wartenberg wheel: A medical device for neurological use.
- Wartenberg's migratory sensory neuropathy: A benign, relapsing and remitting condition involving pain, numbness and paresthesias in the sensory and peripheral nerves.
