= Wartenberg's migratory sensory neuropathy =

- Specialty: Neurology

Wartenberg's migratory sensory neuropathy (also known as Wartenberg's migrant sensory neuritis) is a condition affecting the sensory cutaneous nerves of the limbs, characterised by sudden onset of severe pain upon the movement of a limb that stretches a particular nerve, for example, when turning a key. The condition comes and goes with those affected experiencing long periods, potentially years, without complaint interrupted by one or more attacks in succession. It is considered benign.
