= Olecranon fossa =

Deep triangular depression on the posterior end of the humerus

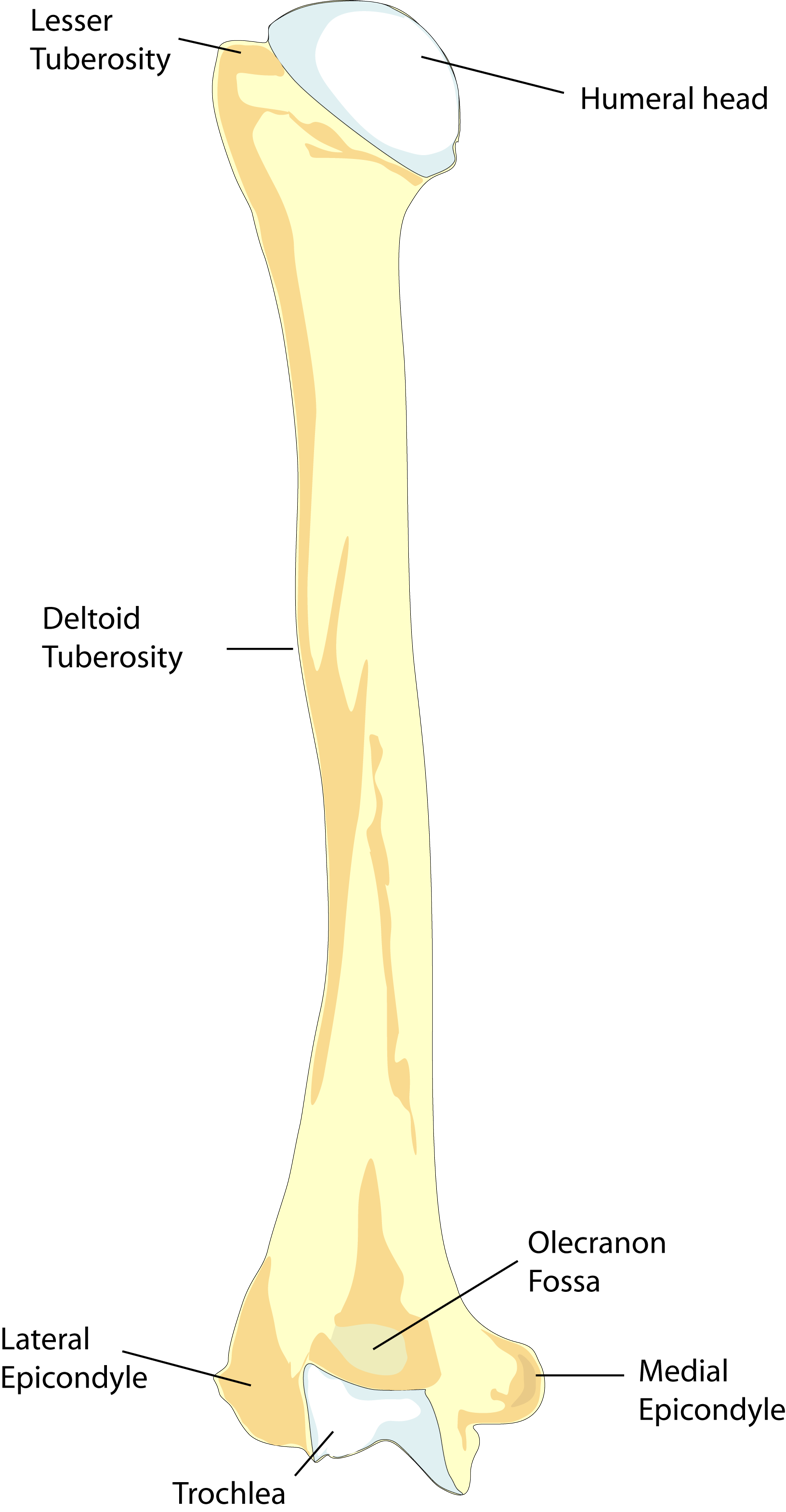
- Left humerus. Posterior view (olecranon fossa visible at bottom center)

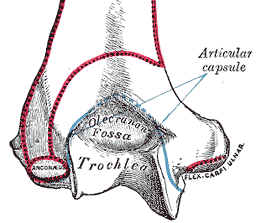
- Left humerus. Posterior view (olecranon fossa visible at bottom center)

Details

Identifiers
- Latin: fossa olecrani
- TA98: A02.4.04.024
- TA2: 1204
- FMA: 23450

The olecranon fossa is a deep triangular depression on the posterior side of the humerus, superior to the trochlea. It provides space for the olecranon of the ulna during extension of the forearm.

== Structure ==
The olecranon fossa is located on the posterior side of the distal humerus.

The joint capsule of the elbow attaches to the humerus just proximal to the olecranon fossa.

== Function ==
The olecranon fossa provides space for the olecranon of the ulna during extension of the forearm, from which it gets its name.

== Other animals ==
The olecranon fossa is present in various mammals, including dogs.

== Additional images ==
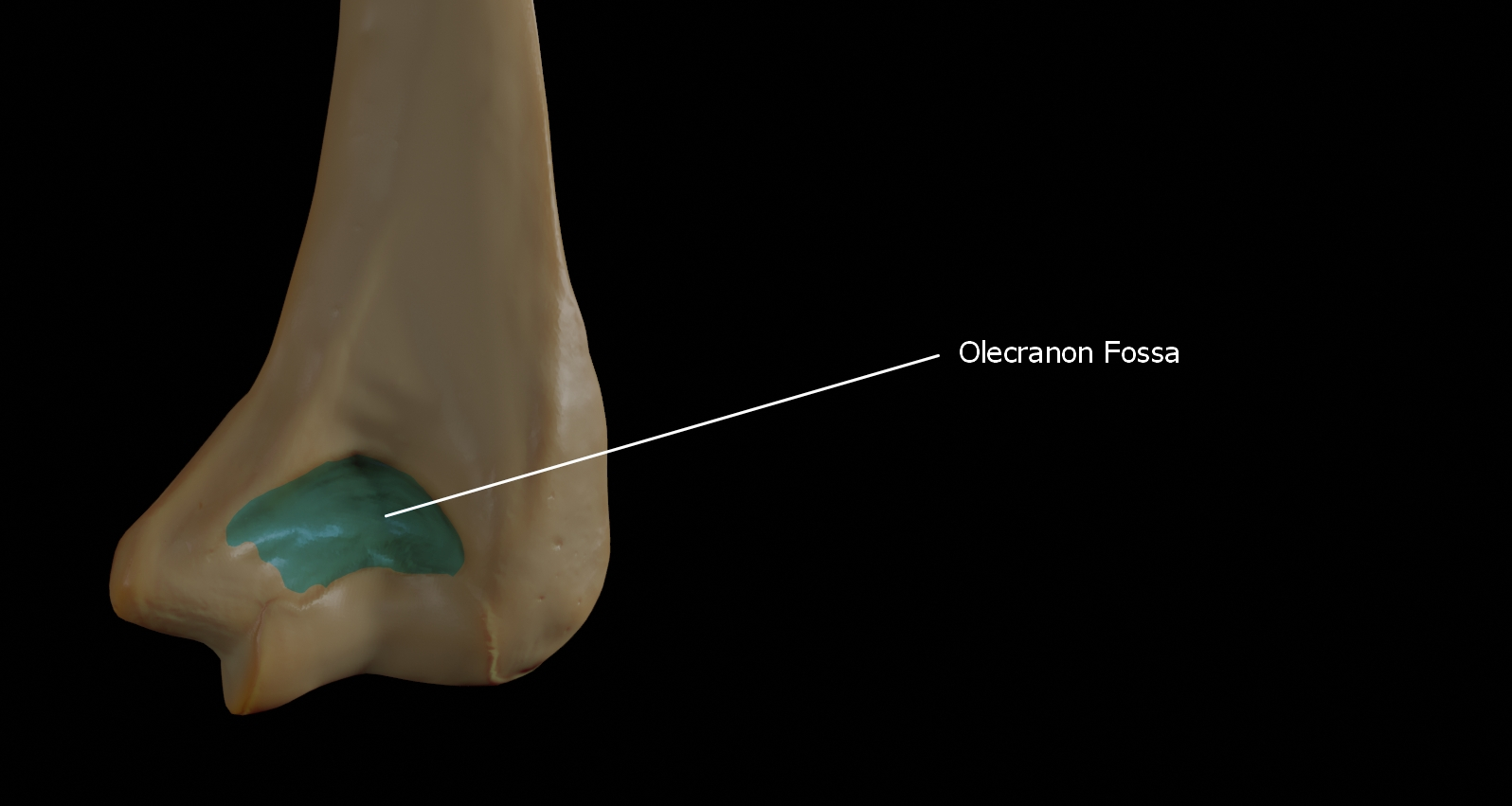
Olecranon fossa

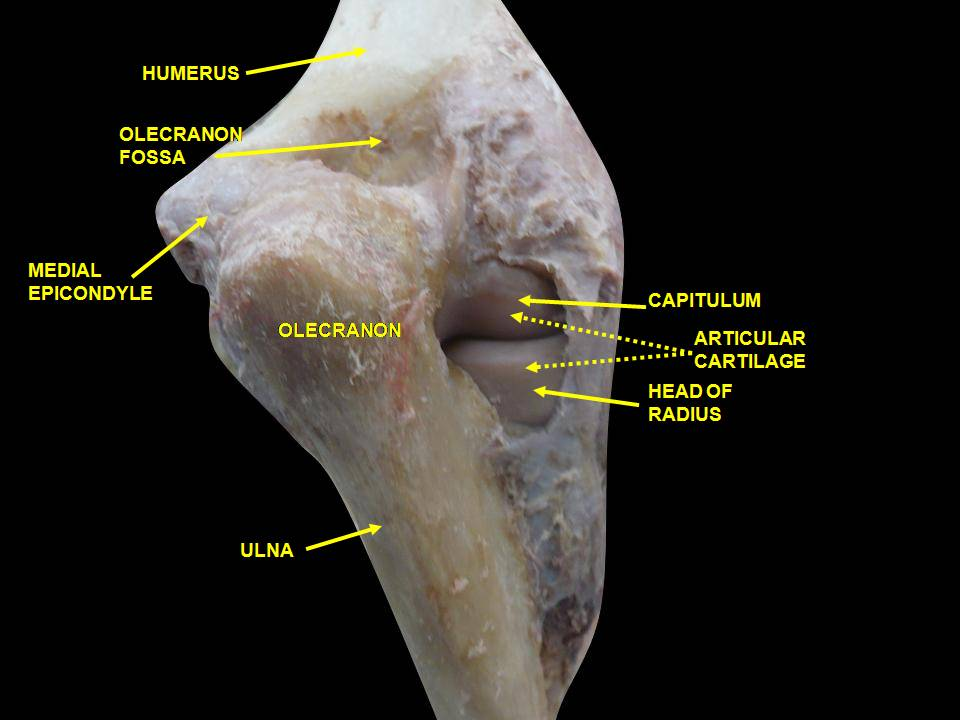
Elbow joint. Deep dissection. Posterior view.

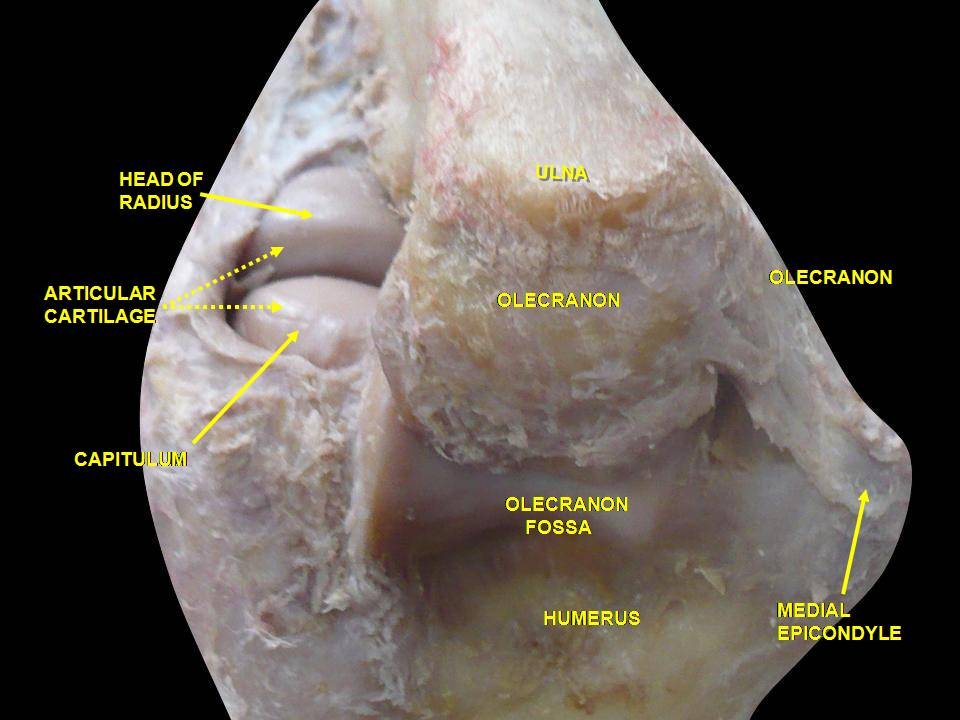
Elbow joint. Deep dissection. Posterior view.

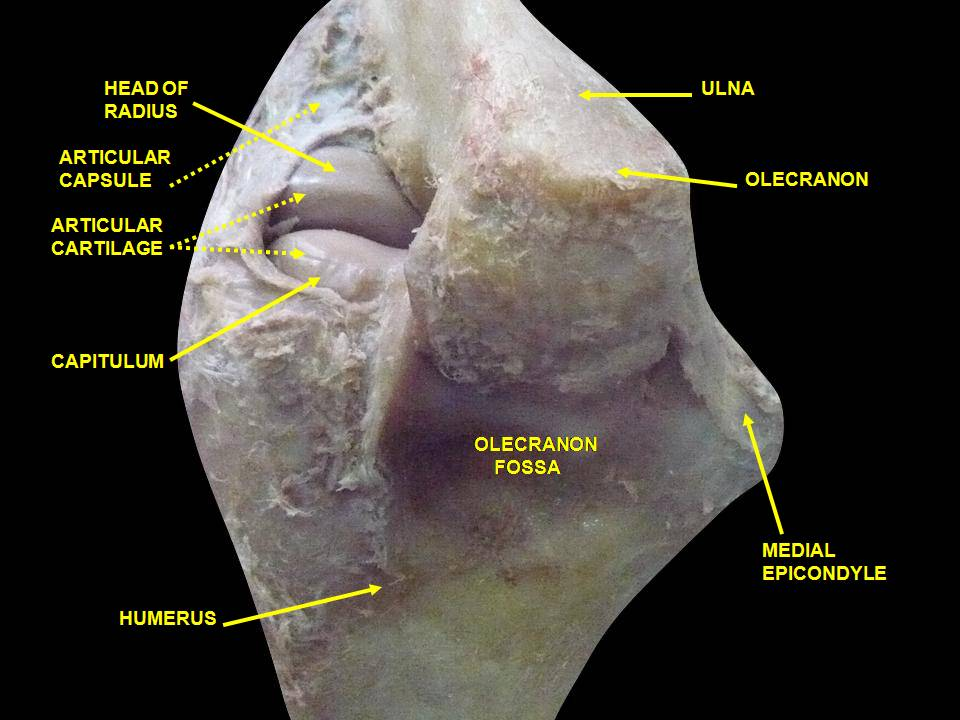
Elbow joint. Deep dissection. Posterior view.
