= Wenis =

Flap of skin under the elbow

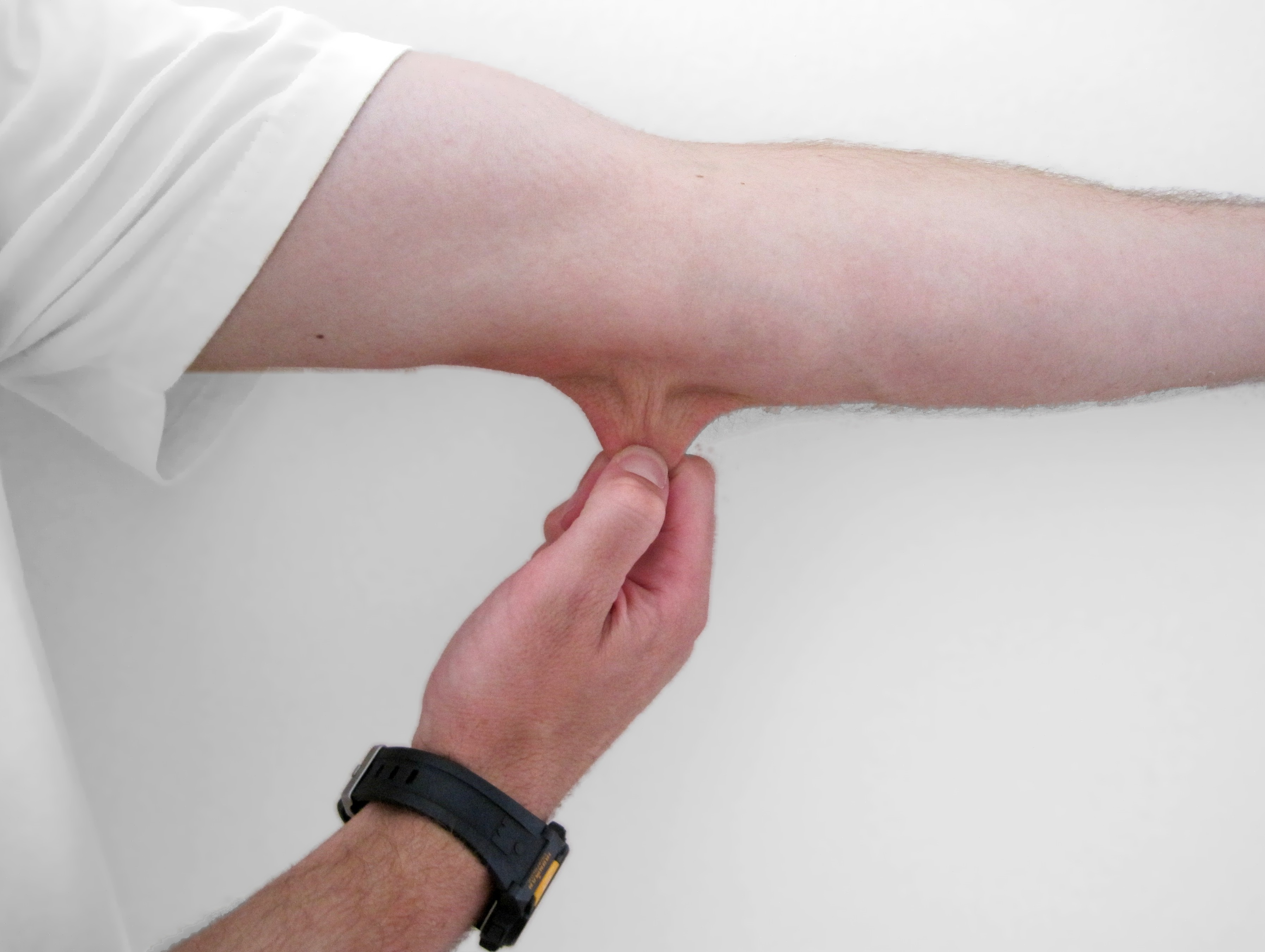
- Stretched wenis below an unflexed elbow

Details
- Synonyms: Olecranal skin
- Pronunciation: /ˈwiːnɪs/
- System: Integumentary

The wenis, sometimes spelled weenus or weenis, is a loose flap of skin underneath the joint of a human elbow. The word developed from slang in the 1990s. The area may also be referred to as olecranal skin or simply elbow skin.

== Anatomy ==
The wenis is located on the exterior tip of the olecranon. The skin is taut and smooth when the elbow is flexed, but loose and wrinkled when the elbow is straightened. It may lose elasticity and begin to sag with age. The bursa located between the ulna and the wenis reduces friction between the skin and the bone.

The region is not typically sensitive to acute pain from pinching. This is due to the wenis having a high amount of subcutaneous fat, relatively few pain receptors, and tough skin. It has a small number of sensory fibers.

The wenis is known as a difficult or impossible spot to lick oneself.

== Clinical significance ==
=== Medical conditions ===
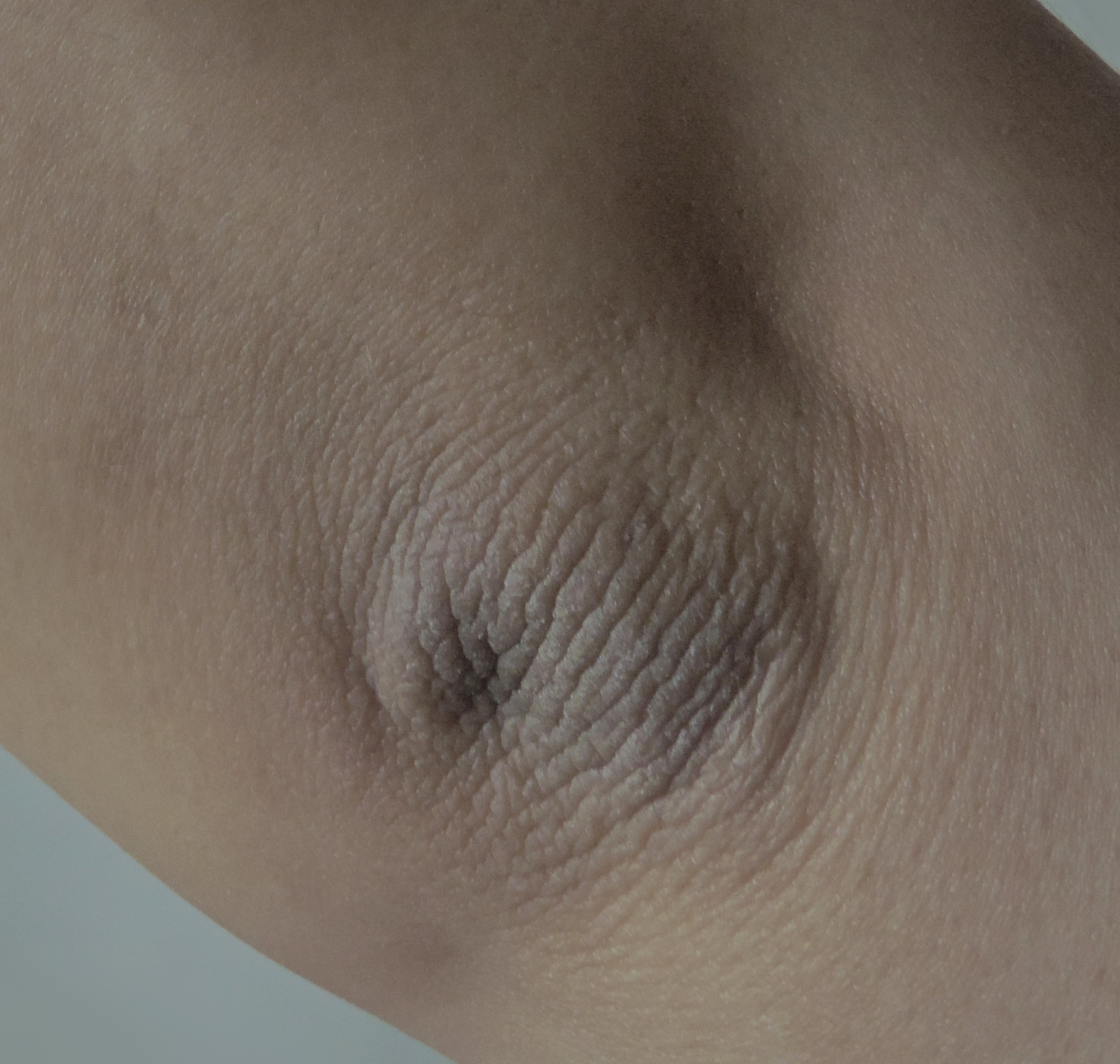
Closeup of a wenis exhibiting acanthosis nigricans

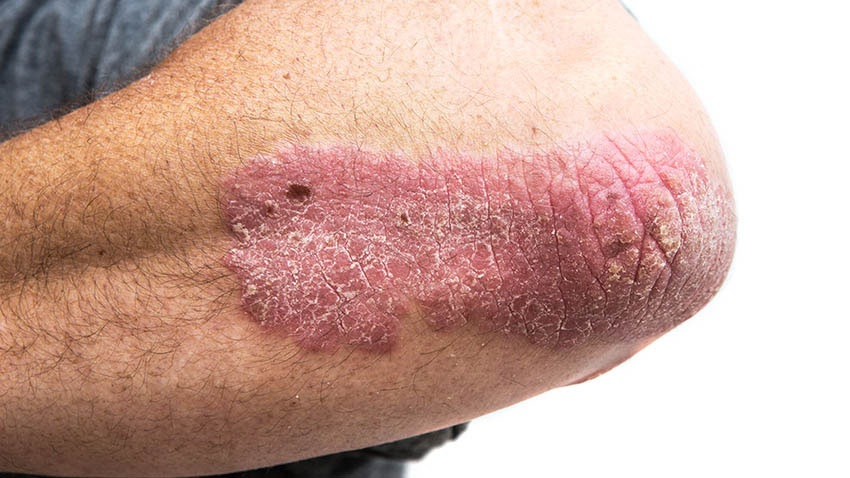
Psoriasis on forearm and wenis

Olecranon bursitis is an inflammation of the bursa that lies under the wenis. Any wound that perforates the olecranal skin, such as a scrape or a bite from an insect, can cause bacteria to infiltrate the bursa. This may lead to infection and a painful buildup of fluid and pus.

Acanthosis nigricans is a medical symptom that can form discoloration and verrucous plaques on the wenis.

=== Medical procedures ===
The wenis is a site where slit-skin smear tests may be performed to diagnose leprosy in patients.

The wenis is also a targeted site for cosmetic surgeries that reduce excess wrinkling known as "elephant elbows." Non-invasive procedures using ultrasound to tighten elbow skin have been successful.

== Etymology ==
Wenis likely appeared as a slang term in the 1990s. It has seen proliferation as a schoolyard meme, and alongside the term wagina, has been an internet colloquialism since the early 2000s. It likely developed as humorous portmanteau of the words penis and wiener. The word was further popularized by media such as The Hangover film franchise.

== See also ==
- Human skin
- Medical slang
