= Epitrochleoanconeus muscle =

Accessory muscle in the elbow

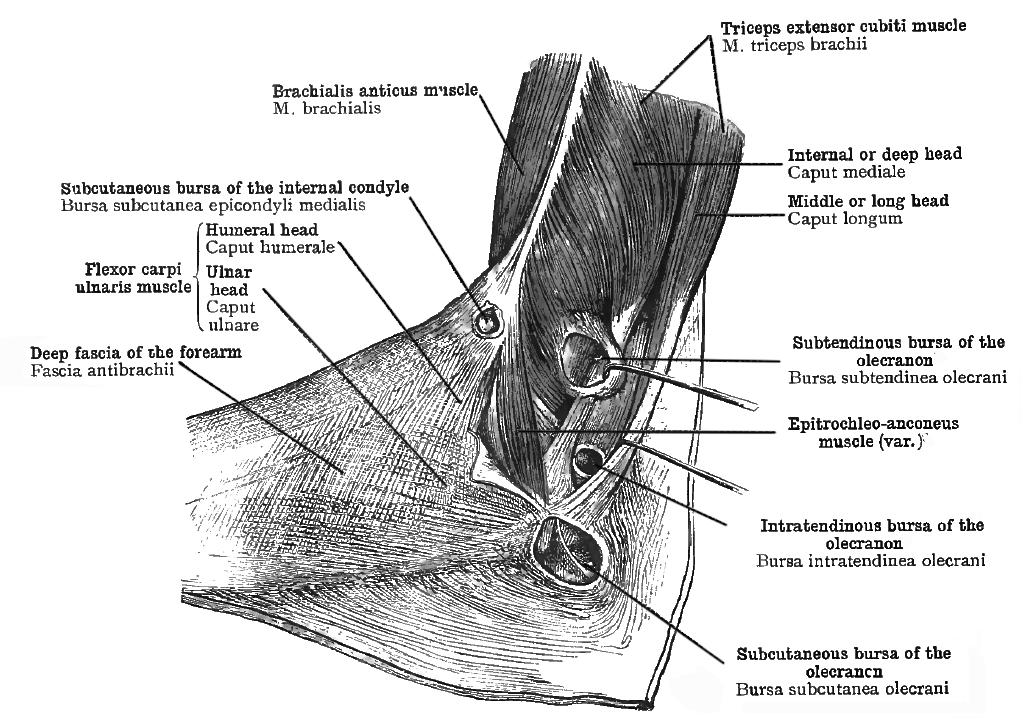
- The inner side of the right elbow showing the epitrochleoanconeus muscle. From Toldt (1919).

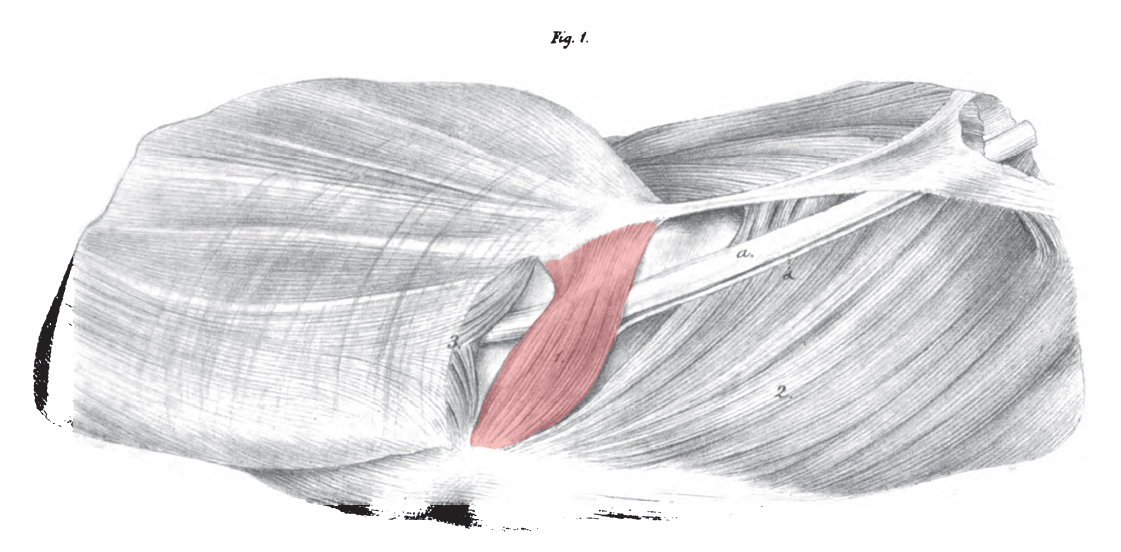
- Illustration of a dissected elbow joint showing ulnar nerve (a), epitrochleoanconeus (1 in red), triceps extensor cubiti (2) and flexor carpi ulnaris muscles (3). From Gruber (1866).

Details
- Origin: Inferior surface of the medial epicondyle of the humerus
- Insertion: olecranon process
- Nerve: Ulnar nerve

Identifiers
- Latin: Musculus epitrochleoanconaeus

The epitrochleoanconeus muscle (anconeous epitrochlearis muscle, anconeus-epitrochlearis or anconeus sextus) is a small accessory muscle of the arm which runs from the back of the inner condyle of the humerus over the ulnar nerve to the olecranon. The average prevalence of this muscle is 14.2% in healthy individuals.

== Structure ==
The epitrochleoanconeus is a short striated muscle which originates on the posterior surface of the medial epicondyle of the humerus. The muscle runs over the ulnar nerve, forms an arch over the cubital tunnel and inserts on the olecranon. It is innervated by the ulnar nerve.

=== Variation ===
There are cases where there is no structure at all bridging the space occupied by the epitrochleoanconeus. The muscle tends to be hypertrophied when associated with cubital tunnel syndrome.

== Clinical significance ==
The presence of the epitrochleoanconeus muscle can lead to ulnar neuropathy, or cubital tunnel syndrome, due to compression of the ulnar nerve. The absence of epitrochleoanconeus muscle or Osborne's ligament can increase the chances of ulnar nerve dislocation.

== History ==
While there were previous identifications of the epitrochleoanconeus in animal studies, under a variety of names, Gruber (1866) seems to offer the first extensive comparative study involving the epitrochleoanconeus in man. This was shortly followed by several accounts by Wood describing his identification of the muscle during a series of dissections in humans along with comparative studies in other animals.

== Other animals ==
In animals with a discrete developed epitrochleoanconeus the muscle acts as an adductor of the olecranon and a supinator of the forearm. A variety of names have been given to this muscle in different species including flexor antebrachii ulnaris, epitrochleo-cubitalis and entepicondylo-ulnaris. The epitrochleoanconius is common amongst tetrapods being found in reptiles, amphibians, mammals and birds.

The epitrochleoanconeus is found widely amongst mammals having been characterised in the mid 19th century in a variety of species including two-toed sloth, duck billed platypus and echidna. Galton (1874) gave an overview of the several species characterised at that point and noted that at least 15 species had been figured with the muscle in Cuvier's "Anatomie comparée" of 1855 but that the muscle was given a wide variety of aliases and was not shown in many species where it should have been seen. The muscle is common in lower primates but has been lost as a discrete muscle in apes, although it has reoccurred in chimpanzees.

== See also ==
- List of anatomical variations
