= Ulnar canal =

Passageway through the wrist for the ulnar nerve and artery

- Transverse section across the wrist and digits.

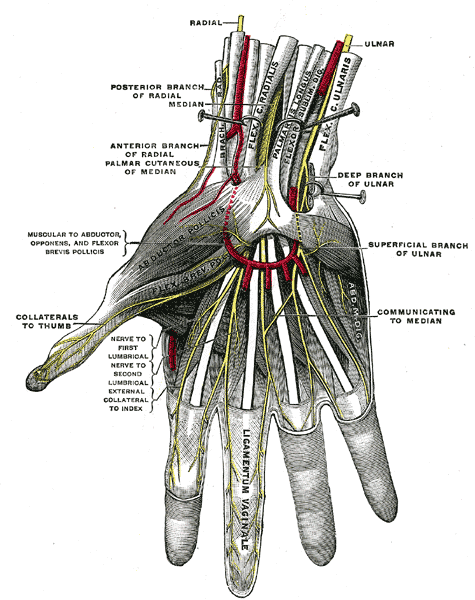
- Superficial palmar nerves.

Details

Identifiers
- Latin: canalis ulnaris
- TA98: A03.5.11.202
- TA2: 2552
- FMA: 42358

The ulnar canal or ulnar tunnel (also known as Guyon's canal or tunnel) is a semi-rigid longitudinal canal in the wrist that allows passage of the ulnar artery and ulnar nerve into the hand. (These are named after the ulna, the long bone on the little finger side of the arm.) The roof of the canal is made up of the superficial palmar carpal ligament, while the deeper flexor retinaculum and hypothenar muscles comprise the floor. The space is medially bounded by the pisiform and pisohamate ligament more proximally, and laterally bounded by the hook of the hamate more distally. It is approximately 4 cm long, beginning proximally at the transverse carpal ligament and ending at the aponeurotic arch of the hypothenar muscles.

== Eponym ==
The ulnar tunnel is named after the French surgeon Jean Casimir Félix Guyon, who originally described the canal in 1861.

== Clinical significance ==
Entrapment of the ulnar nerve at the ulnar canal can result in symptoms of ulnar neuropathy, including numbness or weakness of certain parts of the hand. (See full article on ulnar nerve entrapment.) This is known as ulnar nerve entrapment or Guyon's canal syndrome. There are four subtypes of ulnar neuropathy at the wrist, of which type II is the most common. Guyon's canal syndrome may be secondary to ganglion cyst formation, or compression against a bicycle handlebar.

== See also ==
- Carpal tunnel
