= Ulnar neuropathy =

Disease of the ulnar nerve in the forearm

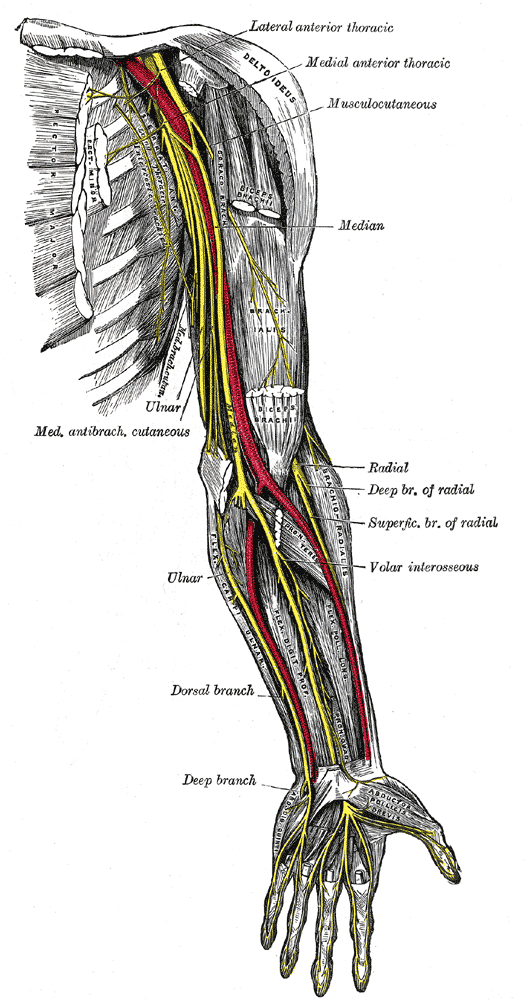
- Nerves of the left upper extremity. (Ulnar labeled at center)
- Specialty: Neurology
- Symptoms: Numbness(fingers)
- Causes: Nerve entrapment, Tumor
- Diagnostic method: CBC, Urinalysis
- Treatment: NSAIDs, Surgery

Ulnar neuropathy is a disorder involving the ulnar nerve. Ulnar neuropathy may be caused by entrapment of the ulnar nerve with resultant numbness and tingling. It may also cause weakness or paralysis of the muscles supplied by the nerve. Ulnar neuropathy may affect the elbow as cubital tunnel syndrome. At the wrist a similar neuropathy is ulnar tunnel syndrome.

== Signs and symptoms ==
In terms of the signs/symptoms of ulnar neuropathy trauma and pressure to the arm and wrist, especially the elbow, the medial side of the wrist, and other sites close to the course of the ulnar nerve are of interest in this condition. Many people complain of sensory changes in the fourth and fifth digits. Rarely, an individual actually notices that the unusual sensations are mainly in the medial side of the ring finger (fourth digit). Sometimes the third digit is also involved, especially on the ulnar (medial) side. The sensory changes can be a feeling of numbness or a tingling, pain rarely occurs in the hand. Complaints of pain tend to be more common in the arm, up to and including the elbow area, which is probably the most common site of pain in an ulnar neuropathy.

== Causes ==
Among the causes of ulnar neuropathy are the following-

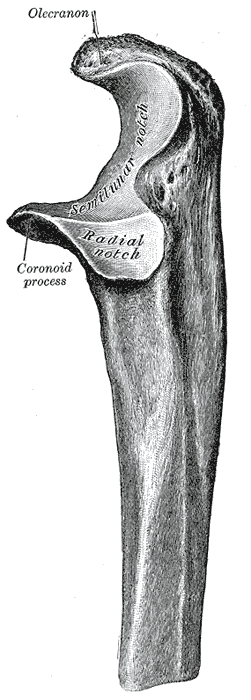
Olecranon

- Olecranon fractures
- Distal humerus fractures
- Medial epicondylar fractures
- Valgus stress
- Childhood supracondylar fracture
- Transient occlusion brachial artery (surgery)
- Subdermal contraceptive (implant)
- Hemophilia
- Tumor
- Blunt injuries

Much more commonly, ulnar neuropathy is caused by overuse of the triceps muscle and repetitive stress combined with poor ergonomics. Overused and hypertonic triceps muscle causes inflammation in the tendon and adhesions with the connective tissue surrounding that tendon and muscle. These in turn impinge on or trap the ulnar nerve. Ulnar neuropathy resulting from repetitive stress is amenable to massage and can usually be fully reversed without cortisone or surgery. Center for Occupational and Environmental Neurology, Baltimore, MD has this to say: "Repetitive Strain Injuries (RSI) refers to many different diagnoses of the neck/shoulder, arm, and wrist/hand area usually associated with work-related ergonomic stressors. Other terms used for Repetitive Strain Injuries are overuse syndrome, musculoskeletal disorders, and cumulative trauma disorders. Some of the more common conditions under these headings include: Cubital Tunnel Syndrome-compression of the ulnar nerve in the cubital tunnel at the elbow."

== Pathophysiology ==
In regards to the pathophysiology of ulnar neuropathy:the axon, and myelin can be affected. Within the axon, fascicles to individual muscles could be involved, with subsequent motor unit loss and amplitude decrease. Conduction block means impaired transmission via a part of the nerve. Conduction block can mean myelin damage to the involved area, slowing of conduction or significant spreading out of the temporal profile of the response with axonal integrity is a hallmark of demyelination.

== Diagnosis ==
Nerve conduction study (Calculation of (NCV)

Diagnostic procedures to determine ulnar neuropathy include:

- Nerve conduction velocity (NCV) a nerve conduction study that measures the speed that a nerve impulse travels through the nerve
- Physical exam and medical history
- Complete blood count
- Urinalysis
- Imaging such as an X-ray, MRI or ultrasound
- Histology study

Ulnar nerve neuropathy at the elbow or the wrist can be assessed by testing for a positive Froment's sign. Little finger abduction and adduction can be tested as well.

== Treatment ==
Treatment for ulnar neuropathy can entail NSAIDs (non-steroidal anti-inflammatory drugs). Other options to surgery are a cortisone injection, and use of a splint, to secure the elbow, a conservative procedure endorsed by some. In cases where surgery is needed, cubital tunnel release, where the ligament of the cubital tunnel is cut, thereby alleviating pressure on nerve can be performed.

Treatment for the common occurrence of ulnar neuropathy resulting from overuse, with no fractures or structural abnormalities, is treatment massage, ice, and anti-inflammatories. Specifically, deep tissue massage to the triceps, myofascial release for the upper arm connective tissue, and cross-fiber friction to the triceps tendon.

== Prognosis ==
In terms of the prognosis of ulnar neuropathy early nerve decompression sees a return to normal ability (function), which should be immediate. Severe cubital tunnel syndrome tends to have a faster recovery process in individuals below the age of 70, as opposed to those above such an age. Finally, revisional surgery for cubital tunnel syndrome does not result well for those individuals over 50 years of age.

== See also ==
- ulnar nerve
- cubital tunnel
- nerve compression syndrome
