= Cubital tunnel =

Passageway around the elbow for the ulnar nerve

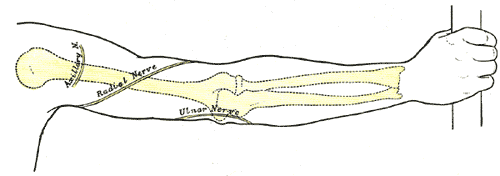
- Back of right upper extremity, showing surface markings for bones and nerves.

The cubital tunnel is a space of the dorsal medial elbow which allows passage of the ulnar nerve around the elbow. Persistent compression of the ulnar nerve in the cubital tunnel is known as cubital tunnel syndrome.

== Structure ==
The cubital tunnel is bordered medially by the medial epicondyle of the humerus, laterally by the olecranon process of the ulna and the tendinous arch joining the humeral and ulnar heads of the flexor carpi ulnaris. The roof of the cubital tunnel is elastic and formed by a myofascial trilaminar retinaculum (also known as the epicondyloolecranon ligament or Osborne band). In 14% of individuals, the roof of this tunnel is covered by the epitrochleoanconeus muscle, an accessory muscle.

== Clinical significance ==
Schematic diagram of the medial side of the elbow showing the ulnar nerve passing through the cubital tunnel

Chronic compression of the ulnar nerve in the cubital tunnel is known as cubital tunnel syndrome. There are several sites of possible compression, traction or friction of the ulnar nerve as it courses behind the elbow. It may also be caused by repetitive strain from the use of a cell phone for example.

== Diagnosis ==
There is no reliable test to diagnose CuTS, and no research directly comparing the cost-effectiveness or acceptability of these tests. Consequently, practice varies in the UK with some clinicians using electrodiagnosics, some using ultrasound some using MRI and some using either none of these or a combination.

=== Clinical tests ===
There are numerous provocative manoeuvres (performed manually in the outpatient clinic by the clinician) which are designed to reproduce the symptoms of CuTS but all have poor diagnostic performance. The absence of studies directly comparing clinical tests to psychometrically valid patient-reported outcomes and lack of a consensus on the reference standard, means that clinicians don’t use clinical grading systems to select patients for surgery.

=== Electrodiagnostics (EDx) ===
Nerve conduction studies (NCS) and electromyography (EMG) are unreliable in CuTS (sensitivity 38-89%). They are not associated with objective measures of hand function or health-related quality of life, and don't predict response to treatment.

EDx cannot detect neuropathy until >80% of axons are lost, which explains the high false-negative rate in CuTS. When EDx tests are normal in the presence of symptoms, many surgeons still offer treatment and most patients still benefit. Conversely, some surgeons withhold treatment until EDx become abnormal.

EDx provokes anxiety and is a painful invasive test. Overall, EDx is an expensive consultant-delivered test (costly financially and associated with treatment delays) and lacks evidence to justify its use in the NHS.

=== Ultrasound ===
A cross-sectional area >10mm^{2} is compatible with a diagnosis of cubital tunnel syndrome.

=== Expert Opinion ===
Expert opinion is that all patients should receive both EDx and ultrasound, although there is no evidence on which to base this recommendation.

== Treatment ==
The treatment for CuTS remains debated given the lack of high-quality studies and absence of research into the natural history of the disease. Some patients with mild/early disease recover spontaneously or with non-surgical treatments (e.g. activity modification, physiotherapy and splints) but surgery is the only reliable cure.

Decompression surgery for CuTS aims to relieve pressure on the ulnar nerve. It is a relatively minor operation which can be done in different ways, all of which are equally effective. However, in-situ decompression appears to be safer than transposition procedures for primary disease, and endoscopic techniques might enable a faster return-to-work. All types of surgery significantly improve hand function and quality of life.
