= Olecranon =

Curved bony eminence of the ulna; forms the pointed part of the elbow

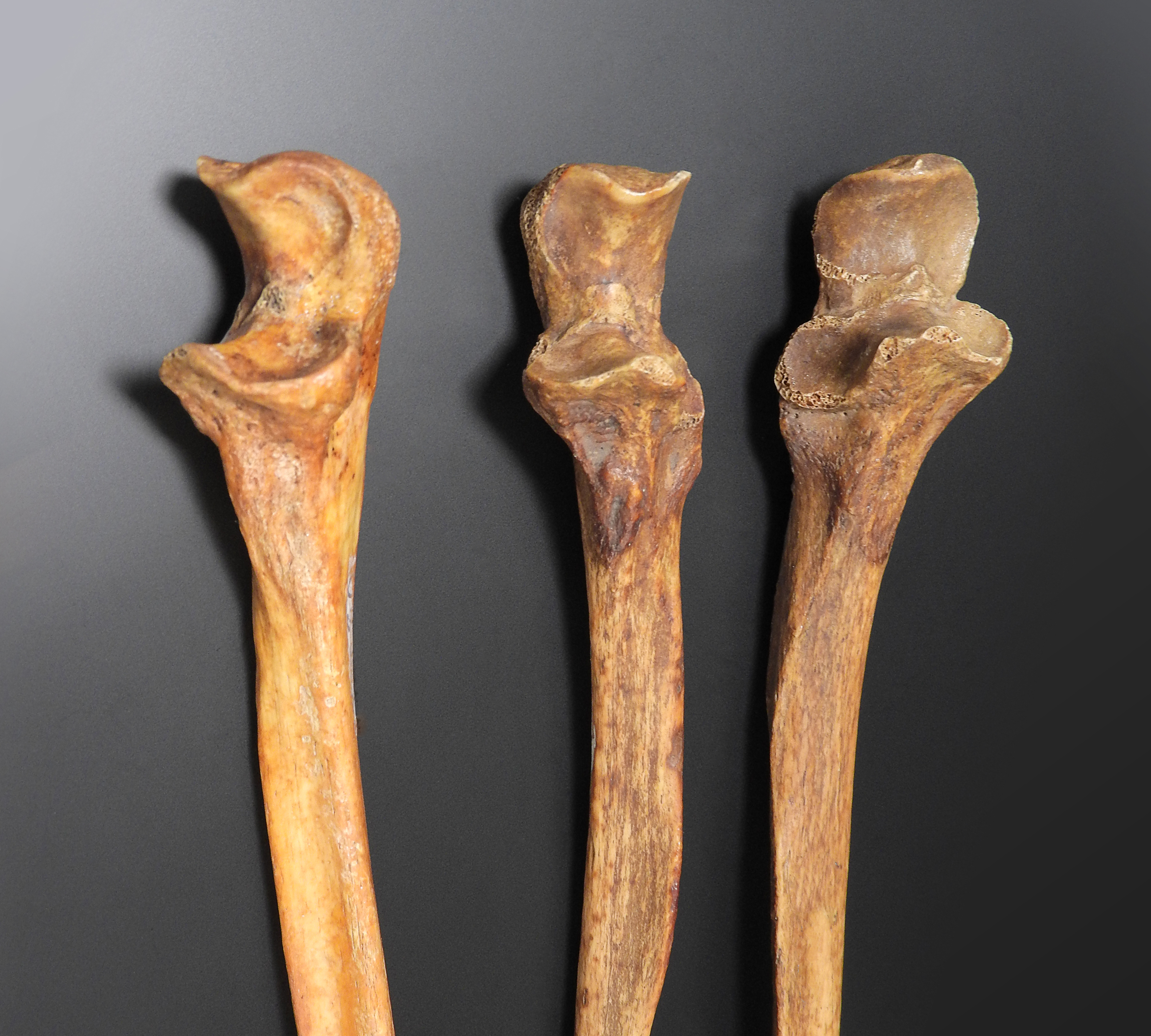
- Three ulnas; the olecranon is the protrusion at the top of each bone.

Details

Identifiers
- Latin: olecranon
- MeSH: D056740
- TA98: A02.4.06.002
- TA2: 1231
- FMA: 39795

The olecranon (/oʊˈlɛkrənɒn/, from Greek olene 'elbow' and kranon 'head'), is a large, thick, curved bony process on the proximal, posterior end of the ulna. It forms the protruding part of the elbow and is opposite to the cubital fossa or elbow pit (trochlear notch). The olecranon serves as a lever for the extensor muscles that straighten the elbow joint.

== Structure ==
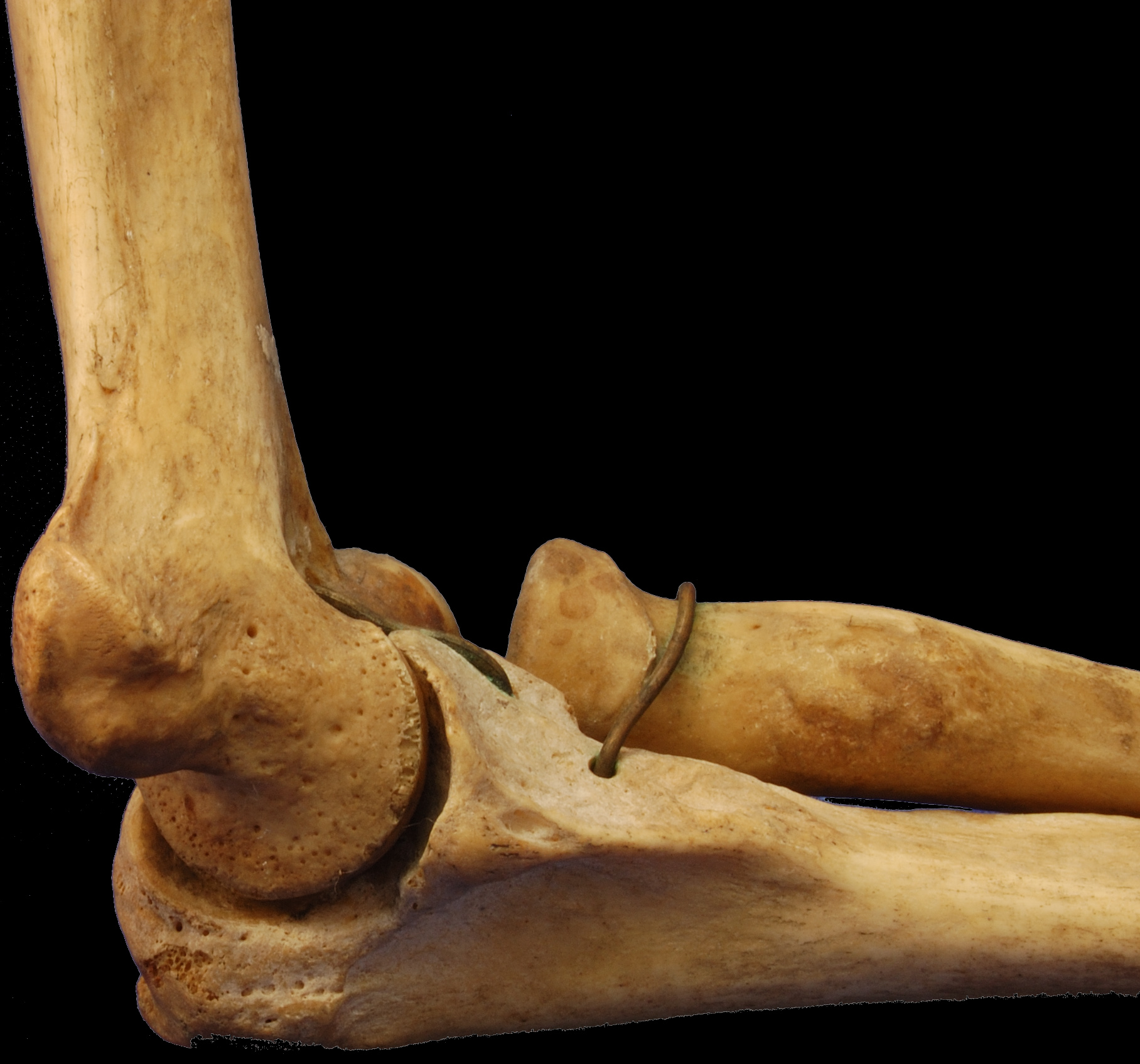
Olecranon (bottom left) in an elbow joint

The olecranon is situated at the proximal end of the ulna, one of the two bones in the forearm. When the hand faces forward (supination) the olecranon faces towards the back (posteriorly).

It is bent forward at the summit so as to present a prominent lip which is received into the olecranon fossa of the humerus during extension of the forearm.

Its base is contracted where it joins the body and the narrowest part of the upper end of the ulna.

Its posterior surface, directed backward, is triangular, smooth, subcutaneous, and covered by a bursa.

Its superior surface is of quadrilateral form, marked behind by a rough impression for the insertion of the triceps brachii; and in front, near the margin, by a slight transverse groove for the attachment of part of the posterior ligament of the elbow-joint.

Its anterior surface is smooth, concave, and forms the upper part of the semilunar notch.

Its borders present continuations of the groove on the margin of the superior surface; they serve for the attachment of ligaments, viz., the back part of the ulnar collateral ligament medially, and the posterior ligament laterally.

From the medial border a part of the flexor carpi ulnaris arises; while to the lateral border the anconeus muscle is attached.

== Clinical significance ==
Fractures of the olecranon are common injuries. An olecranon fracture with anterior displacement of the radial head is called a Hume fracture.

== Etymology ==
The word "olecranon" comes from the Greek olene, meaning elbow, and kranon, meaning head.

== Additional images ==
Upper extremity of left ulna. Lateral aspect

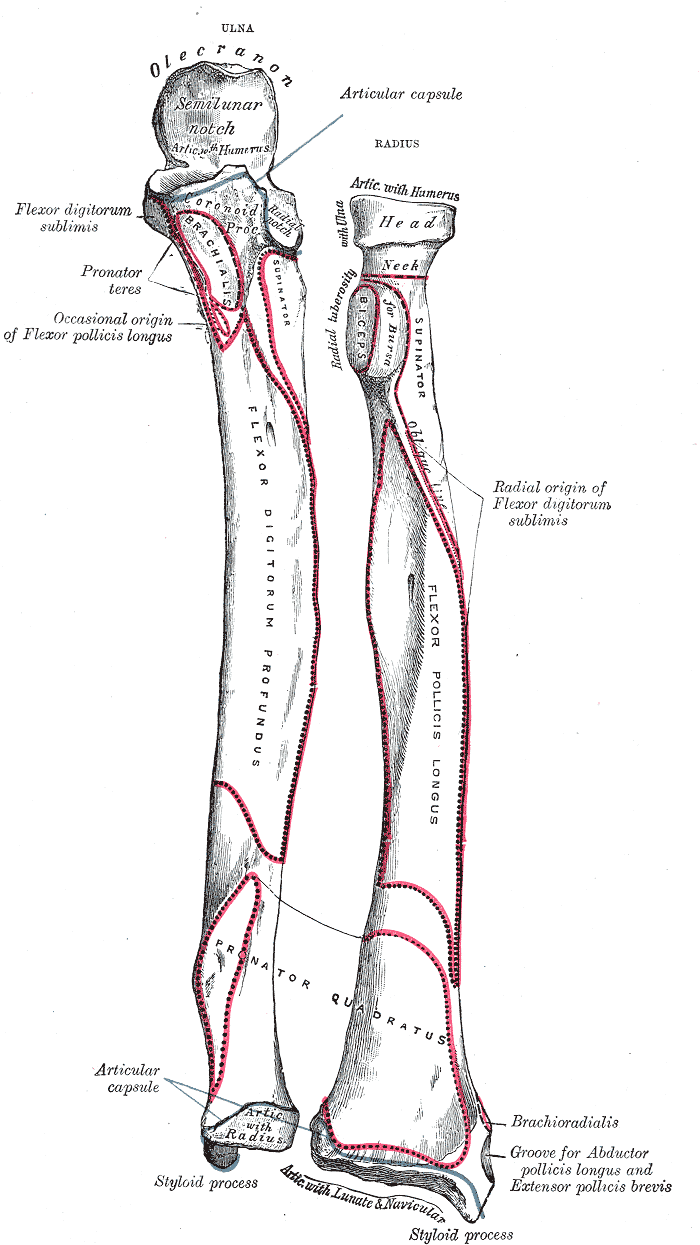
Bones of left forearm. Anterior aspect.

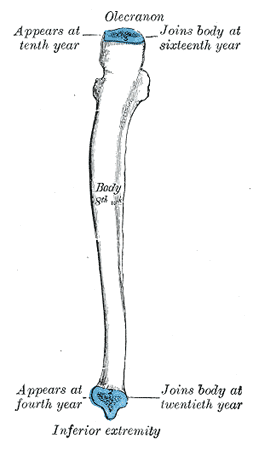
Plan of ossification of the ulna. From three centers.

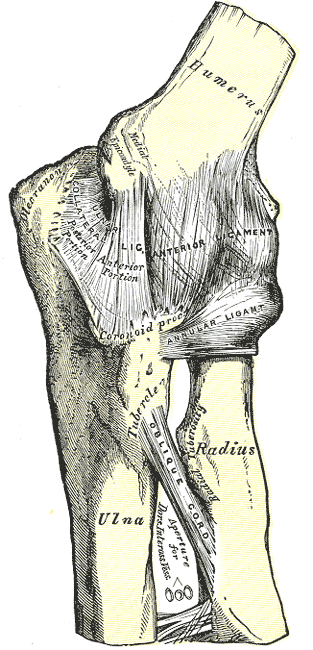
Left elbow-joint, showing anterior and ulnar collateral ligaments.

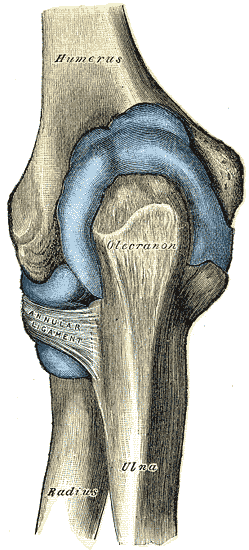
Capsule of elbow-joint (distended). Posterior aspect.

== See also ==
- Olecranal skin
- Olecranon bursitis
- Olecranon fossa
