= Muscles of the hand =

Muscles of the human hand

- Muscles and other structures of wrist and palm

Details
- Origin: Upper extremity
- Insertion: Hand and fingers
- Nerve: radial, median, and ulnar nerves (from C5–T1)
- Actions: Flexion, extension, adduction, abduction of the hand and fingers and oppossion of the thumb

Identifiers
- FMA: 42368

The muscles of the hand are the skeletal muscles responsible for the movement of the hand and fingers. The muscles of the hand can be subdivided into two groups: the extrinsic and intrinsic muscle groups. The extrinsic muscle groups are the long flexors and extensors. They are called extrinsic because the muscle belly is located on the forearm. The intrinsic group are the smaller muscles located within the hand itself. The muscles of the hand are innervated by the radial, median, and ulnar nerves from the brachial plexus.

== Intrinsic ==
The intrinsic muscle groups are the thenar (thumb) and hypothenar (little finger) muscles; the interossei muscles (four dorsally and three volarly) originating between the metacarpal bones; and the lumbrical muscles arising from the deep flexor (and which are special because they have no bony origin) to insert on the dorsal extensor hood mechanism. Palmaris brevis which is a superficial muscle and adductor pollicis are also intrinsic muscles.

== Extrinsic ==
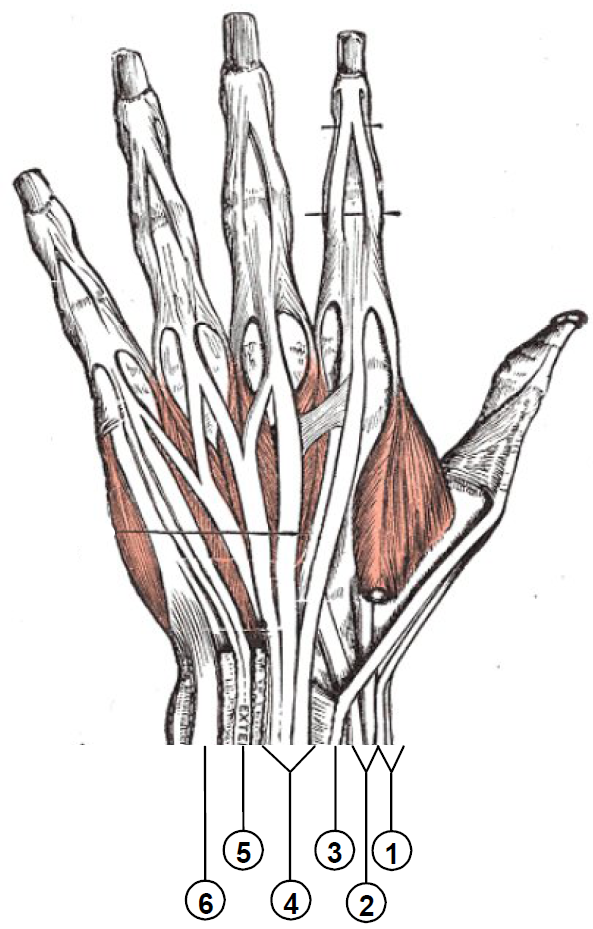
Extensor compartments of wrist (back of hand)

The fingers have two long flexors, located on the underside of the forearm. They insert by tendons to the phalanges of the fingers. The deep flexor attaches to the distal phalanx, and the superficial flexor attaches to the middle phalanx. The flexors allow for the actual bending of the fingers. The thumb has one long flexor and a short flexor in the thenar muscle group. The human thumb also has other muscles in the thenar group (opponens and abductor brevis muscle), moving the thumb in opposition, making grasping possible.

The extensors are located on the back of the forearm and are connected in a more complex way than the flexors to the dorsum of the fingers. The tendons unite with the interosseous and lumbrical muscles to form the extensor hood mechanism. The primary function of the extensors is to straighten out the digits. The thumb has two extensors in the forearm; the tendons of these form the anatomical snuff box. Also, the index finger and the little finger have an extra extensor, used, for instance, for pointing. The extensors are situated within 6 separate compartments.

Compartment 1 (Most radial)	Compartment 2	Compartment 3	Compartment 4	Compartment 5	Compartment 6 (Most ulnar)
Abductor pollicis longus	Extensor carpi radialis longus	Extensor pollicis longus	Extensor indicis	Extensor digiti minimi	Extensor carpi ulnaris
Extensor pollicis brevis	Extensor carpi radialis brevis		Extensor digitorum communis		

The first four compartments are located in the grooves present on the dorsum of inferior side of radius, while the 5th compartment is in between radius and ulna. The 6th compartment is in the groove on the dorsum of inferior side of ulna.

== Nerve supply ==
The muscles of the hand are innervated by the radial, median, and ulnar nerves.

The radial nerve innervates the finger extensors and the thumb abductor; that is, the muscles that extend at the wrist and metacarpophalangeal joints (knuckles) and abduct and extend the thumb. The median nerve innervates the flexors of the wrist and digits, the abductors and opponens of the thumb, the first and second lumbricals. The ulnar nerve innervates the remaining intrinsic muscles of the hand.

All muscles of the hand are innervated by the brachial plexus (C5–T1) and can be classified by innervation:

Nerve	Muscles
Radial	Extensors: carpi radialis longus and brevis, digitorum, digiti minimi, carpi ulnaris, pollicis longus and brevis, and indicis. Other: abductor pollicis longus.
Median	Flexors: carpi radialis, pollicis longus, digitorum profundus (half), superficialis, and pollicis brevis (superficial head). Other: palmaris longus. abductor pollicis brevis, opponens pollicis, and first and second lumbricals.
Ulnar	Flexor carpi ulnaris, flexor digitorum profundus (half), palmaris brevis, flexor digiti minimi, abductor digiti minimi, opponens digiti minimi, adductor pollicis, flexor pollicis brevis (deep head), palmar and dorsal interossei, and third and fourth lumbricals.

== See also ==
- Muscles of the thumb

== Sources ==
- Jones, Lynette A.; Lederman, Susan J. (2006). Human Hand Function. Oxford University Press US. ISBN 9780195173154.
- Ross, Lawrence M.; Lamperti, Edward D., eds. (2006). Thieme Atlas of Anatomy: General Anatomy and Musculoskeletal System. Thieme. ISBN 1-58890-419-9.
