= Pollicis brevis muscle =

Pollicis brevis muscle may refer to:

- Abductor pollicis brevis muscle
- Extensor pollicis brevis muscle
- Flexor pollicis brevis muscle
