= CV4 technique =

Osteopathic technique

CV4 or CV4 Bulb decompression is a technique used by osteopathic physicians to reduce anxiety and other complaints. Research has suggested that this technique reduces pain, decreases sleep latency, and decreases sympathetic activity. Physiologically CV4 is believed to facilitate extension phase of the Primary Respiratory Movement (PRM), resist the flexion phase of PRM and inhibit the occipital flexion phase.

Other research has not always shown this technique to offer any advantages over "touch."

== Procedure ==
The CV-4 technique is done with the patient lying supine with the physician's thenar eminences cradling the occiput with the fingers left free. The physician encourages extension (towards the physician) while discouraging flexion. These movements are continued until a "still point" is reached, where softening and warmth of the surrounding occur.
