= Flexor pollicis muscle =

Flexor pollicis muscle may refer to:

- Flexor pollicis brevis muscle
- Flexor pollicis longus muscle
