= Abductor pollicis muscle =

Abductor pollicis muscle may refer to:

- Abductor pollicis brevis muscle (musculus abductor pollicis brevis)
- Abductor pollicis longus muscle (musculus abductor pollicis longus)
