= Adductor pollicis muscle =

Muscle in the thenar compartment

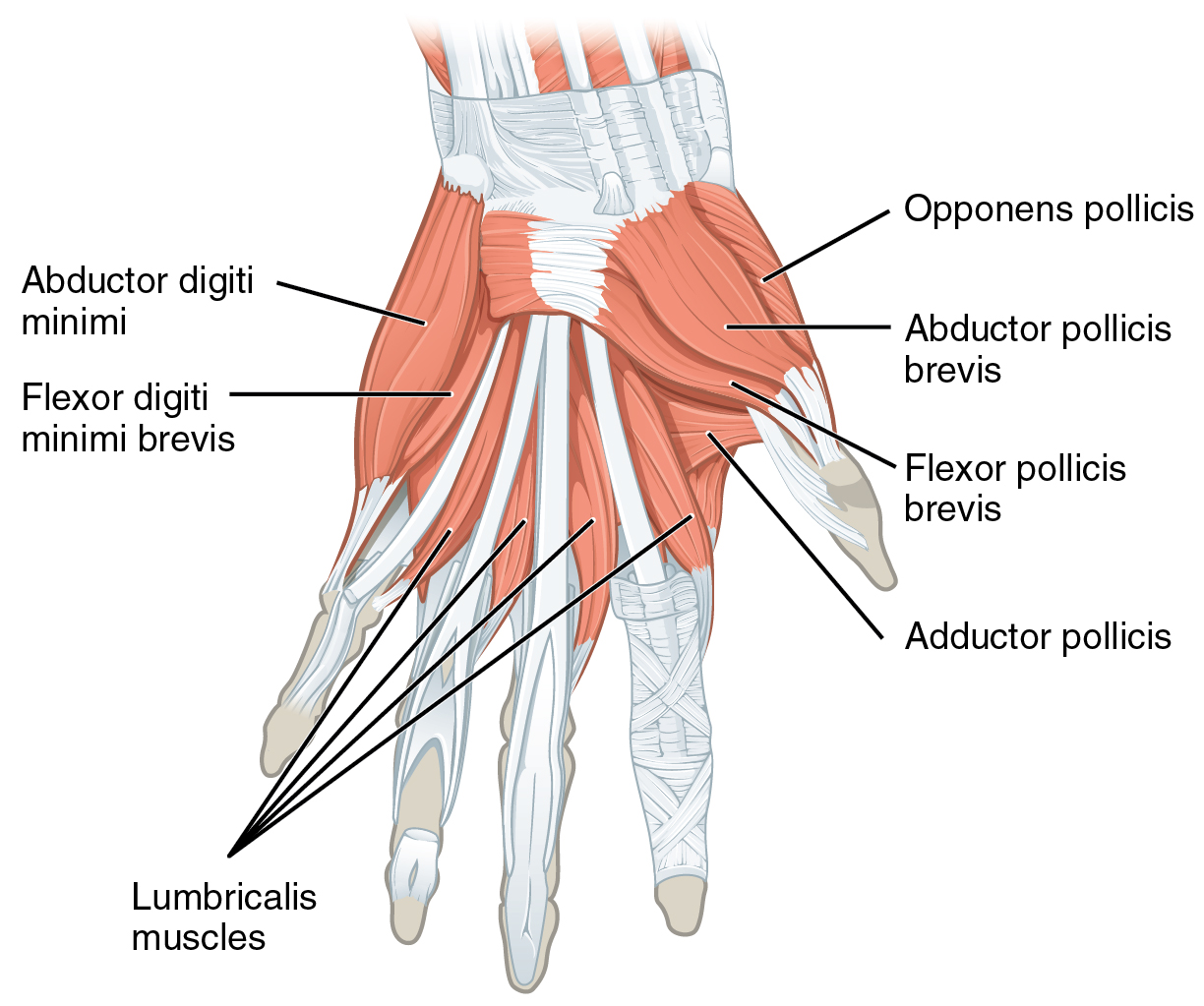
- The superficial muscles of the left hand. Palmar view Adductor pollicis is labelled at bottom right.

Details
- Origin: Transverse head: anterior body of the third metacarpal Oblique head: bases of the second and the third metacarpals and the adjacent trapezoid and capitate bones
- Insertion: Medial side of the base of the proximal phalanx of the thumb and the ulnar sesamoid
- Artery: Deep palmar arch
- Nerve: Deep branch of the ulnar nerve (T1)
- Actions: Adducts the thumb at the carpometacarpal joint
- Antagonist: Abductor pollicis longus muscle, abductor pollicis brevis muscle

Identifiers
- Latin: musculus adductor pollicis
- TA98: A04.6.02.059
- TA2: 2526
- FMA: 37380

In human anatomy, the adductor pollicis muscle is a muscle in the hand that functions to adduct the thumb. It has two heads: transverse and oblique.

It is a fleshy, flat, triangular, and fan-shaped muscle deep in the thenar compartment beneath the long flexor tendons and the lumbrical muscles at the center of the palm. It overlies the metacarpal bones and the interosseous muscles.

== Structure ==
=== Oblique head ===
The oblique head (Latin: adductor obliquus pollicis) arises by several slips from the capitate bone, the bases of the second and third metacarpals, the intercarpal ligaments, and the sheath of the tendon of the flexor carpi radialis.

From this origin the greater number of fibers pass obliquely downward and converge to a tendon, which, uniting with the tendons of the medial portion of the flexor pollicis brevis and the transverse head of the adductor pollicis, is inserted into the ulnar side of the base of the proximal phalanx of the thumb, a sesamoid bone (the so-called adductor sesamoid) being present in the tendon of people aged 14 or older.

A considerable fasciculus, however, passes more obliquely beneath the tendon of the flexor pollicis longus to join the lateral portion of the flexor pollicis brevis and the abductor pollicis brevis.

=== Transverse head ===
The transverse head (Latin: adductor transversus pollicis) is deeply seated.

It is triangular, arising by a broad base from the lower two-thirds of the palmar surface of the third metacarpal bone; the fibers converge, to be inserted with the medial part of the flexor pollicis brevis and the oblique head into the ulnar side of the base of the proximal phalanx of the thumb.

=== Relations ===
The radial artery passes between the two heads, travelling from the back of the hand into the palm, where it forms the deep palmar arch.

=== Innervation ===
The adductor pollicis is innervated by the deep branch of the ulnar nerve (C8–T1).

Between the oblique and transverse heads is a thin fibrous arcade which the nerve passes as it traverses the palm laterally. The nerve is accompanied by the deep palmar arch.

== Function ==
While adduction of the thumb (bringing it back into the plane of the palm of the hand from its previously abducted position) is mainly produced by the adductor pollicis, it can also bring the thumb to the side of the palm and index finger and the flexor pollicis brevis and the opponens pollicis help in thumb adduction.

== Clinical significance ==
Froment's sign is used to test for a compromised adductor pollicis muscle.

In neuromuscular monitoring, the ulnar nerve is stimulated and the strength of adductor pollicis contraction is measured.

== Other animals ==
The adductor pollicis evolved from the contrahens I muscle as man's ancestors' thumbs and big toes became opposable. It might also contain an element of the thumb's interosseous muscle.

In the Pan-Homo LCA the oblique head of the adductor pollicis probably had a relatively small physiological cross sectional area (PCSA) and both heads probably acted as extensors and adductors at the carpometacarpal joint. In humans the PCSA of the oblique head is relatively enlarged and both heads act as flexors at this joint.

== See also ==
- Adductor hallucis muscle

== Additional images ==
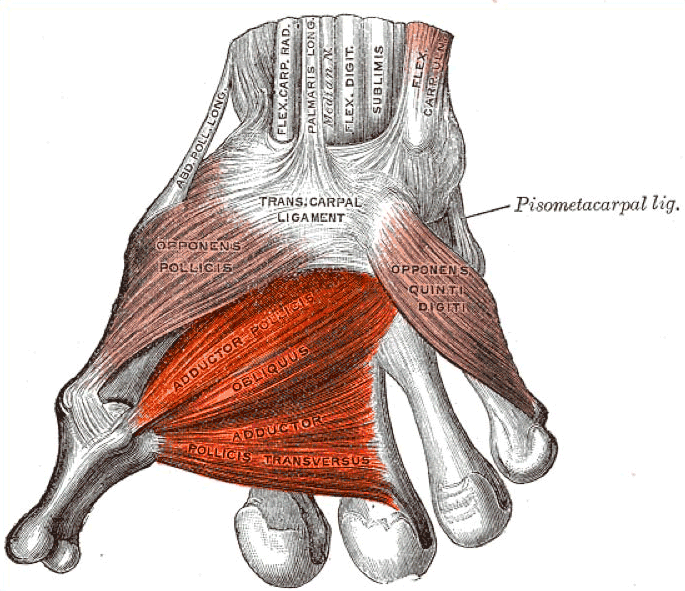
The muscles of the thumb. (Adductor pollicis transversus is red band at bottom, and adductor pollicis obliquus is red band immediately above it.)

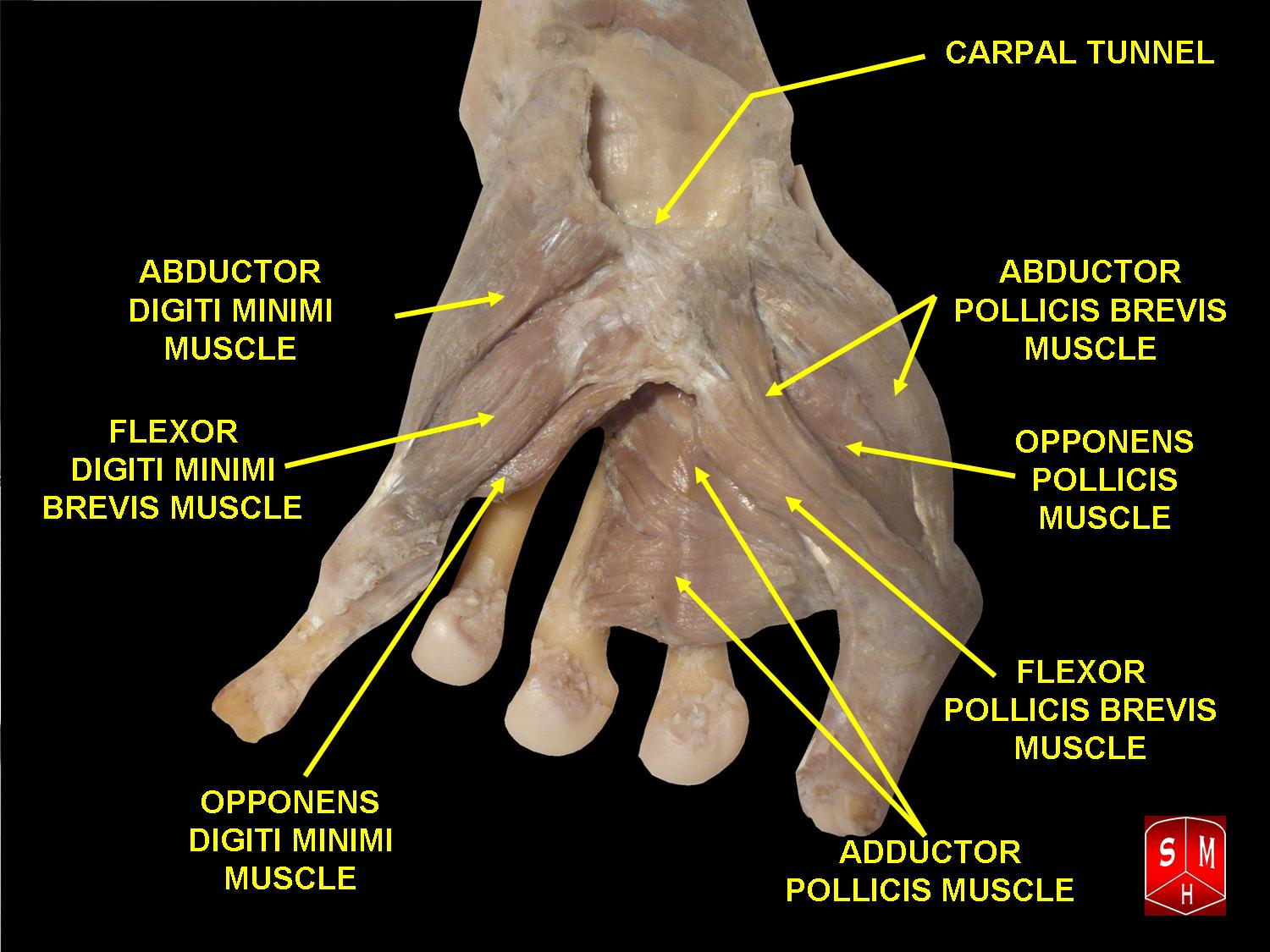
Adductor pollicis muscle

Transverse section across the wrist and digits.

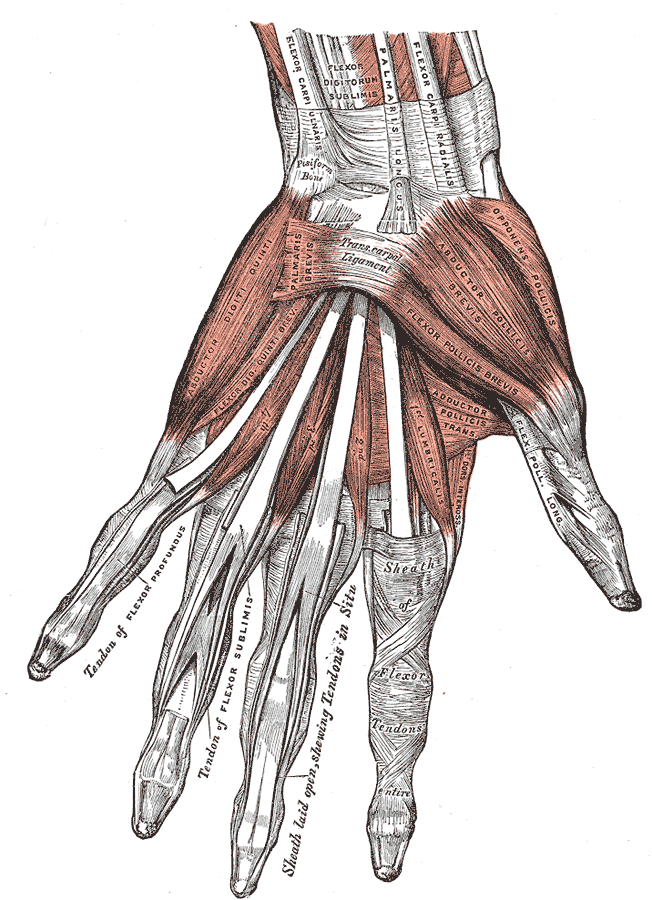
The muscles of the left hand. Palmar surface.

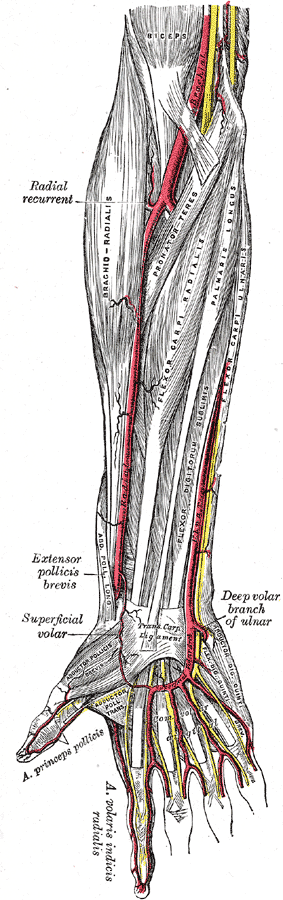
The radial and ulnar arteries.

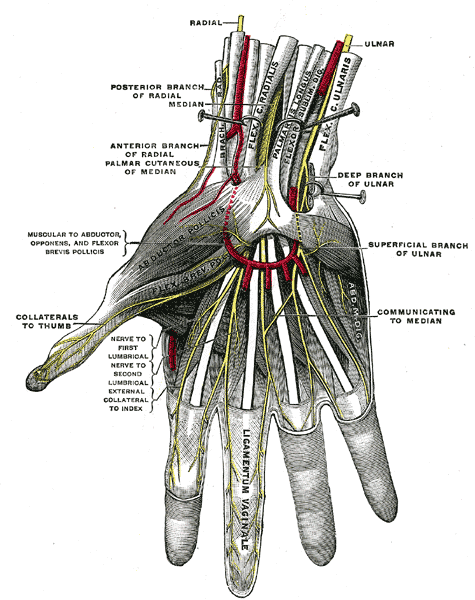
Superficial palmar nerves.

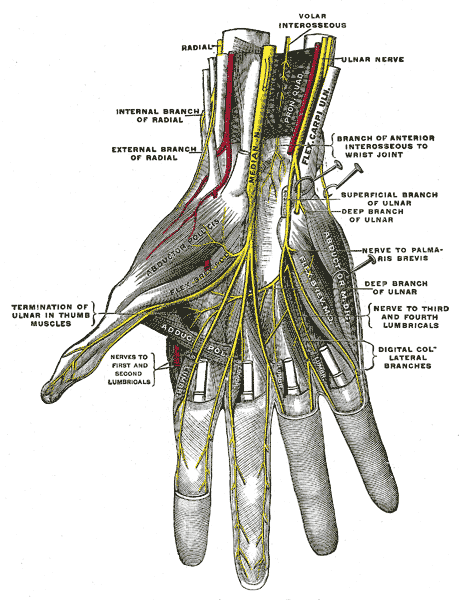
Deep palmar nerves.

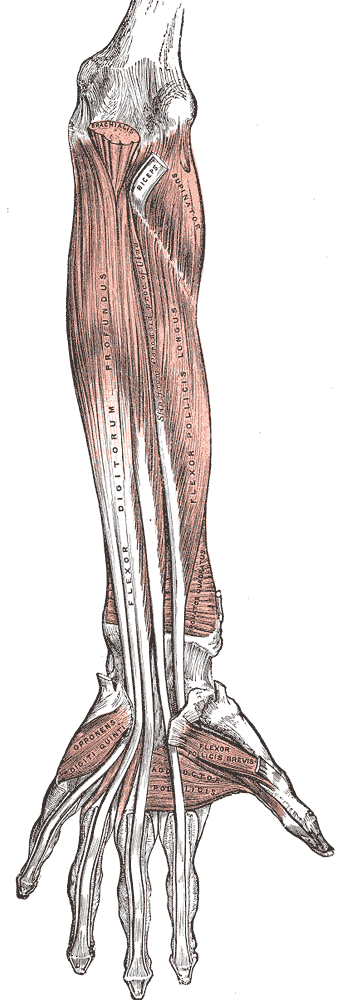
Front of the left forearm. Deep muscles. (Adductor pollicis visible at bottom center.)

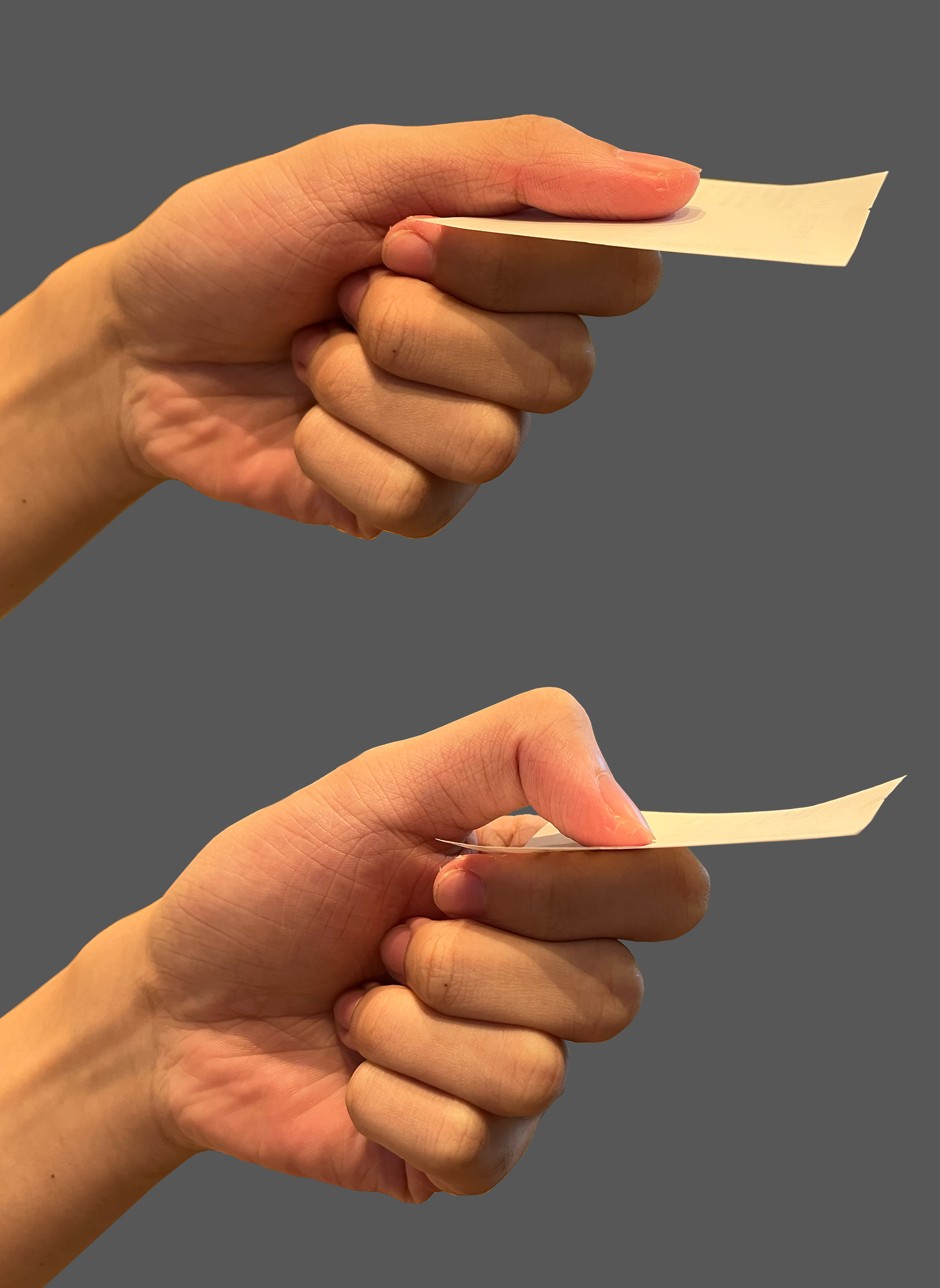
Negative (above) and positive Froment's sign

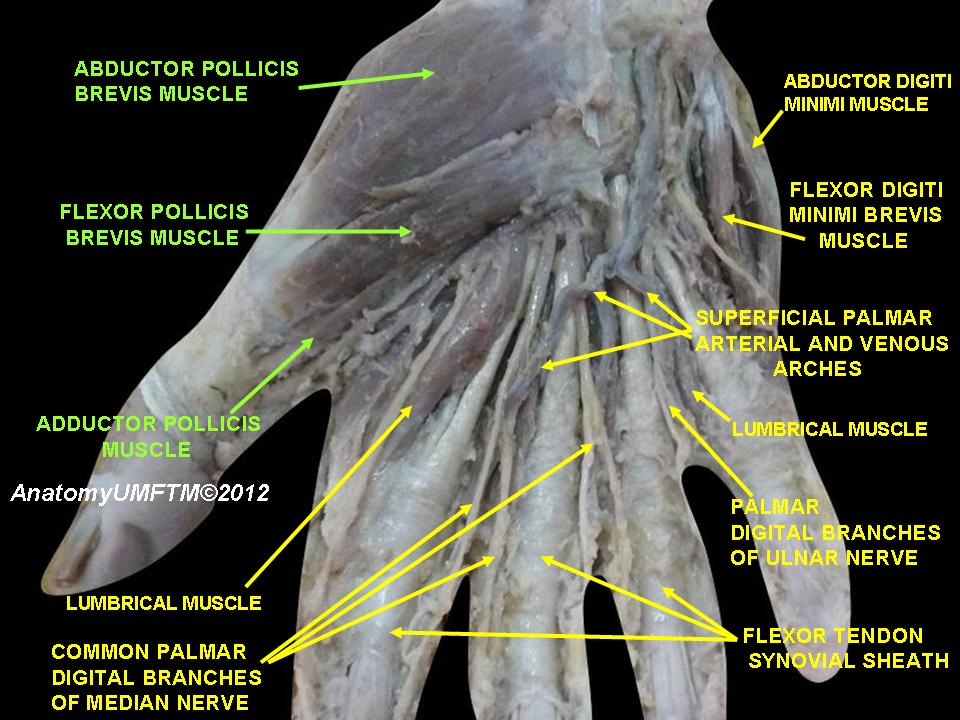
Adductor pollicis muscle

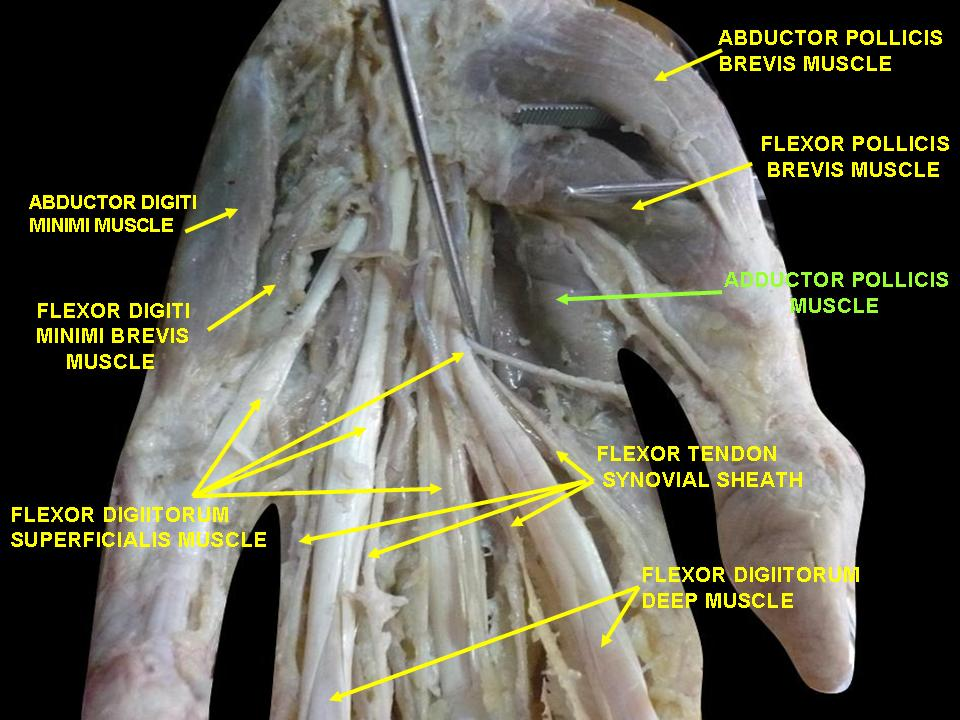
Adductor pollicis muscle

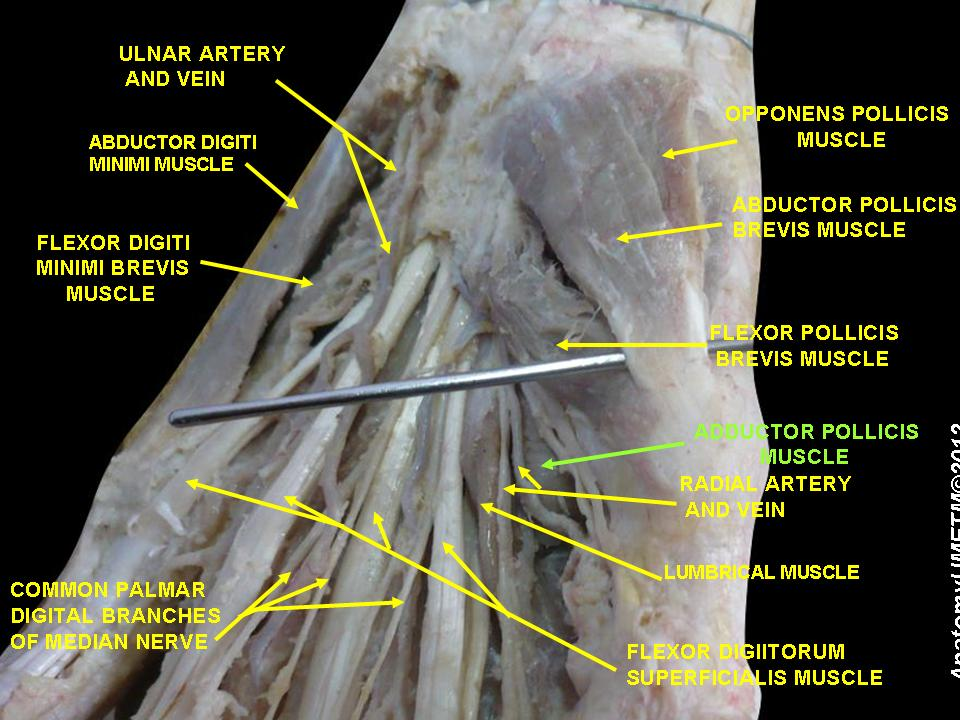
Adductor pollicis muscle

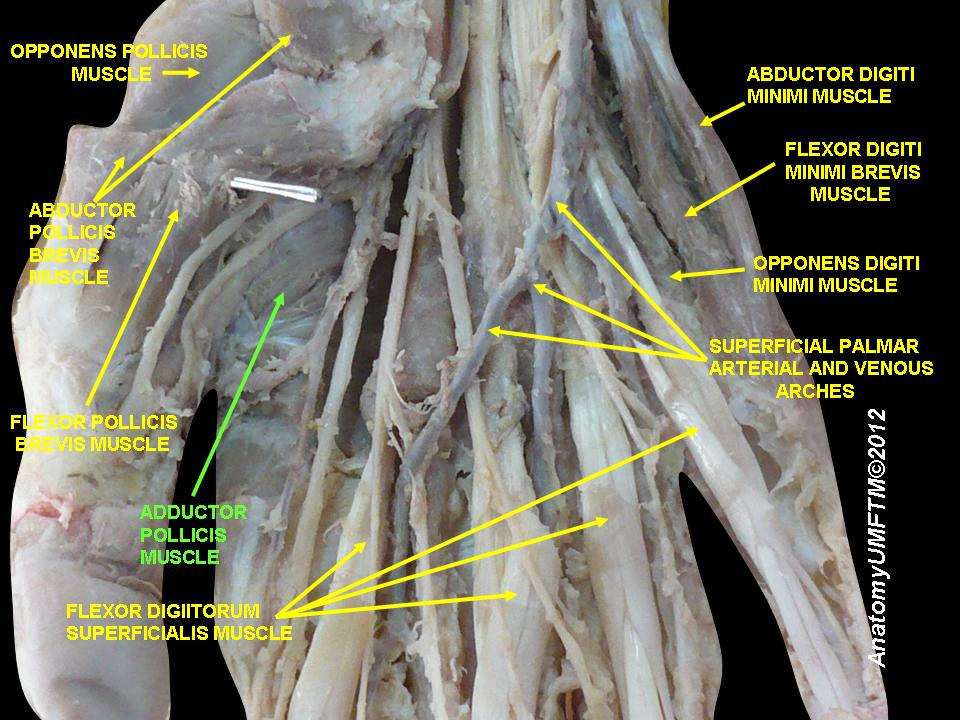
Adductor pollicis muscle

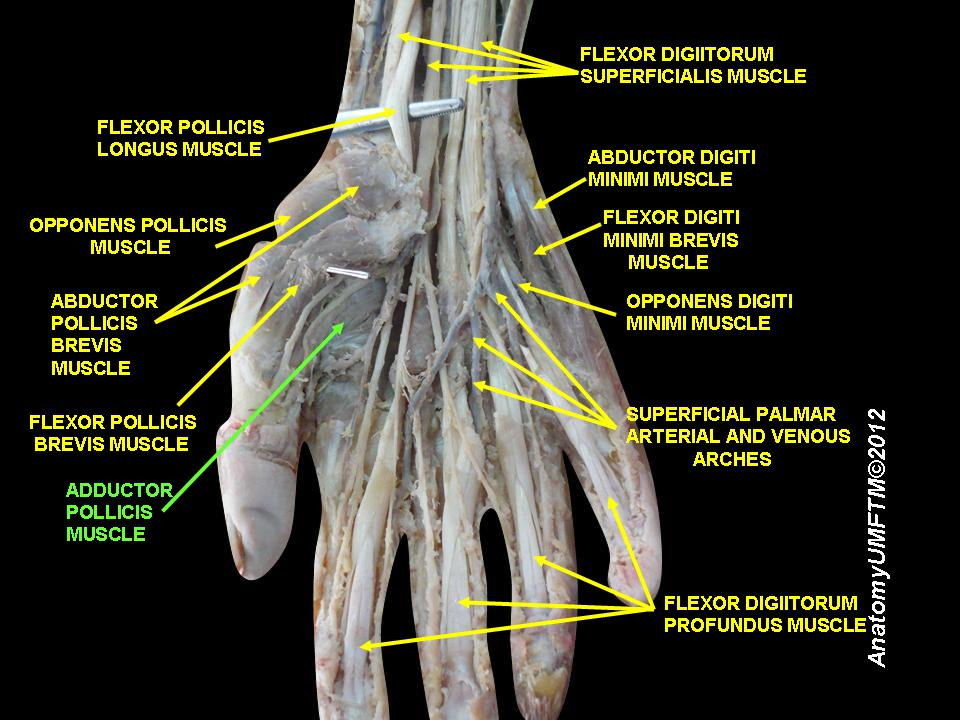
Adductor pollicis muscle
