= Ball of the thumb =

Ball of the thumb may refer to:

- Thenar eminence, most fleshy portion of the palm of the human hand, located adjacent to the second joint of the thumb
- Thumb pulp fleshy portion opposite the nail, of the first segment (distal phalanx) of the human thumb
