= Recurrent branch of the median nerve =

Supplies the thenar muscles

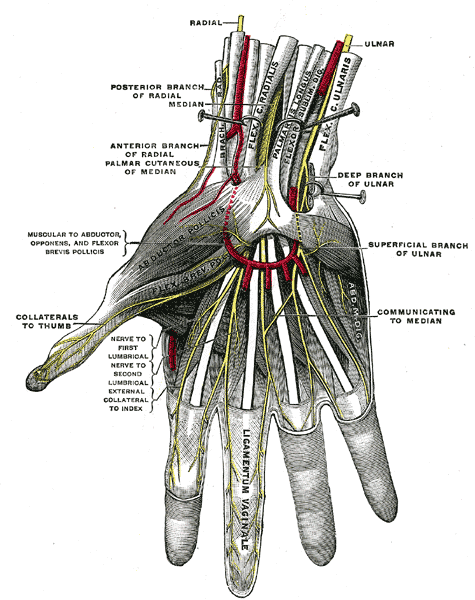
- Superficial palmar nerves. (Recurrent branch labeled at center left as "Muscular to abductor, opponens, and flexor brevis pollicis.")

Details
- From: median nerve

Identifiers
- Latin: ramus recurrens nervi mediani

The recurrent branch of the median nerve is the branch of the median nerve which supplies the thenar muscles. It is also occasionally referred to as the thenar branch of the median nerve, or the thenar muscular branch of the median nerve.

== Anatomy ==
=== Course ===
It usually passes distal to the transverse carpal ligament. It ends in the opponens pollicis.

=== Distribution ===
In the thenar eminence, the recurrent branch of the median nerve provides motor innervation to:

- opponens pollicis muscle
- abductor pollicis brevis muscle
- superficial part of flexor pollicis brevis muscle

A separate, more proximal branch of the median nerve additionally provides motor innervation to the 1st and 2nd lumbricals of the hand. All other intrinsic muscles of the hand receive motor innervation via the ulnar nerve.

== Clinical significance ==
The recurrent branch of the median nerve may be affected in carpal tunnel syndrome, or from its own separate peripheral neuropathies.

=== Surgery ===
The recurrent branch of the median nerve is also colloquially called the "Million Dollar Nerve", because injury to this nerve during carpal tunnel surgery can lead to a million dollar lawsuit. Injury to this nerve can lead to loss of function of the thumb. Such injury can happen if the flexor retinaculum is transected too radially. The possibility of injury to this nerve is even greater when it runs through the ligament without any curling at the distal part of the ligament.

== See also ==
- Median nerve
- Thenar eminence
- Abductor pollicis brevis muscle
- Flexor pollicis brevis muscle
- Opponens pollicis muscle
- Nerve injury
- Carpal tunnel surgery
