= Opponens pollicis muscle =

Muscle in the thenar compartment

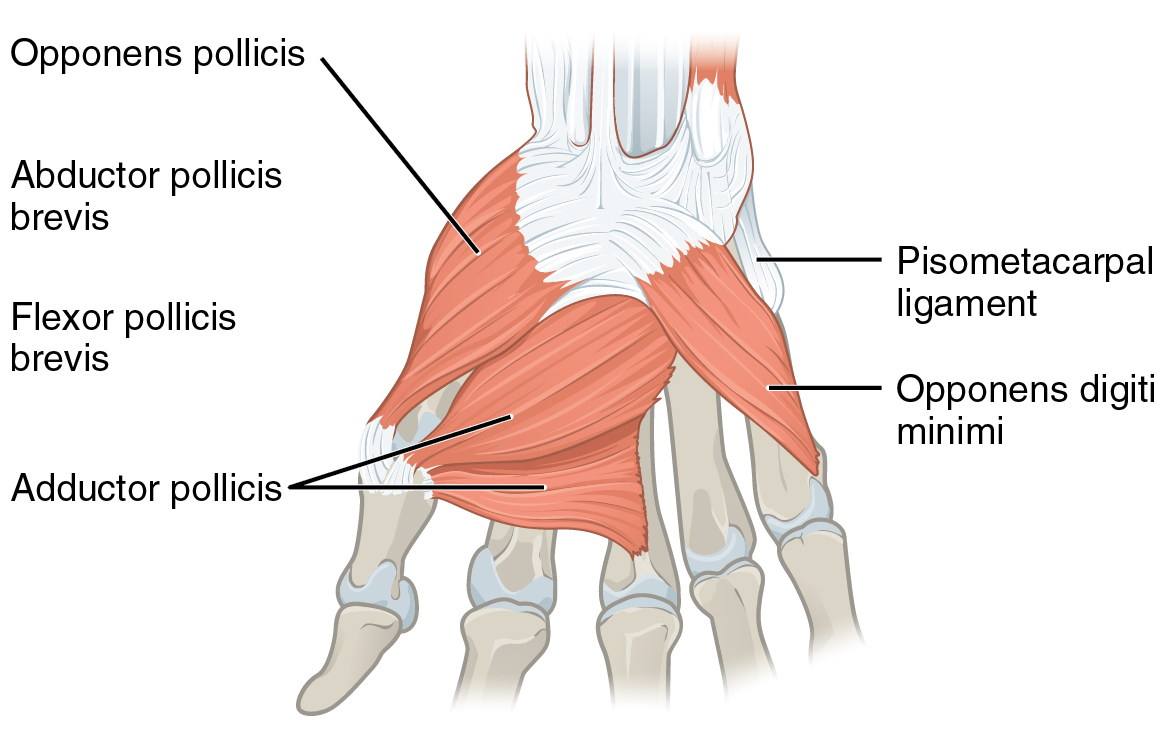
- The deep muscles of the right hand. Palmar surface.

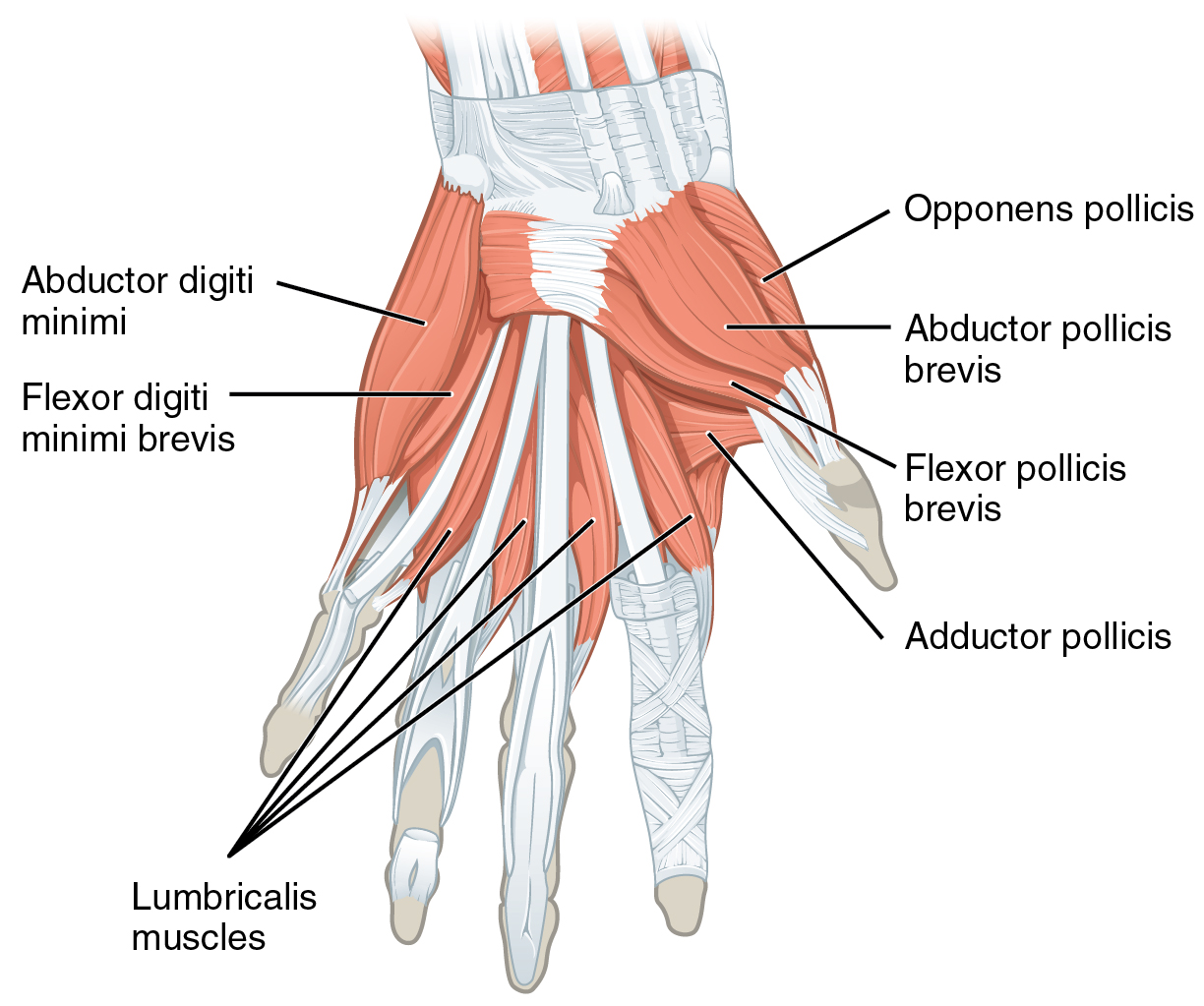
- The superficial muscles of the left hand. Palmar surface.

Details
- Origin: Trapezium and transverse carpal ligament
- Insertion: Metacarpal bone of the thumb on its radial side
- Artery: Superficial palmar arch
- Nerve: Recurrent branch of the median nerve
- Actions: Flexion of the thumb's metacarpal at the first carpometacarpal joint, which aids in opposition of the thumb

Identifiers
- Latin: musculus opponens pollicis
- TA98: A04.6.02.058
- TA2: 2525
- FMA: 37379

The opponens pollicis is a small, triangular muscle in the hand, which functions to oppose the thumb. It is one of the three thenar muscles. It lies deep to the abductor pollicis brevis and lateral to the flexor pollicis brevis.

== Structure ==
The opponens pollicis muscle is one of the three thenar muscles. It originates from the flexor retinaculum of the hand and the tubercle of the trapezium. It passes downward and laterally, and is inserted into the whole length of the metacarpal bone of the thumb on its radial side.

=== Innervation ===
Like the other thenar muscles, the opponens pollicis is innervated by the recurrent branch of the median nerve. In 20% of the population, opponens pollicis is innervated by the ulnar nerve.

=== Blood supply ===
The opponens pollicis receives its blood supply from the superficial palmar arch.

== Function ==
Opposition of the thumb is a combination of actions that allows the tip of the thumb to touch the tips of other fingers. The part of apposition that this muscle is responsible for is the flexion of the thumb's metacarpal at the first carpometacarpal joint. This specific action cups the palm. Many texts, for simplicity, use the term opposition to represent this component of true apposition. In order to truly appose the thumb, the actions of a number of other muscles are needed at the thumb's metacarpophalangeal joint. Note that the two opponens muscles (opponens pollicis and opponens digiti minimi) are named so because they oppose each other, but their actions appose the bones.

== Additional images ==
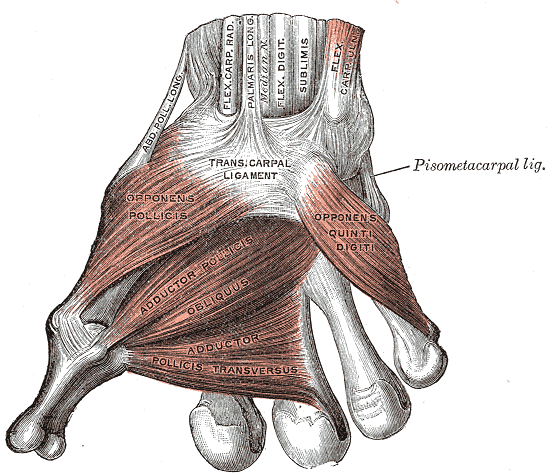
The muscles of the thumb

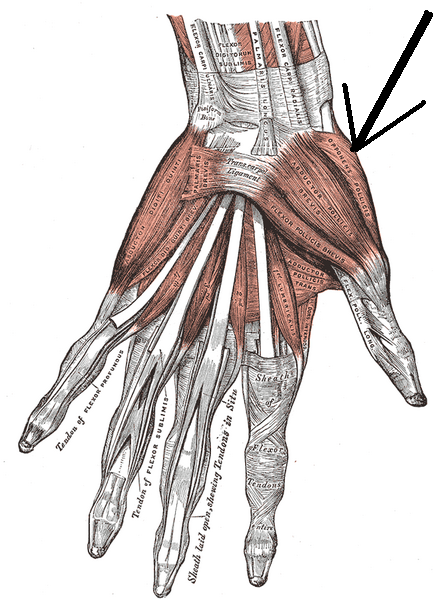
The muscles of the right hand. Palmar surface.

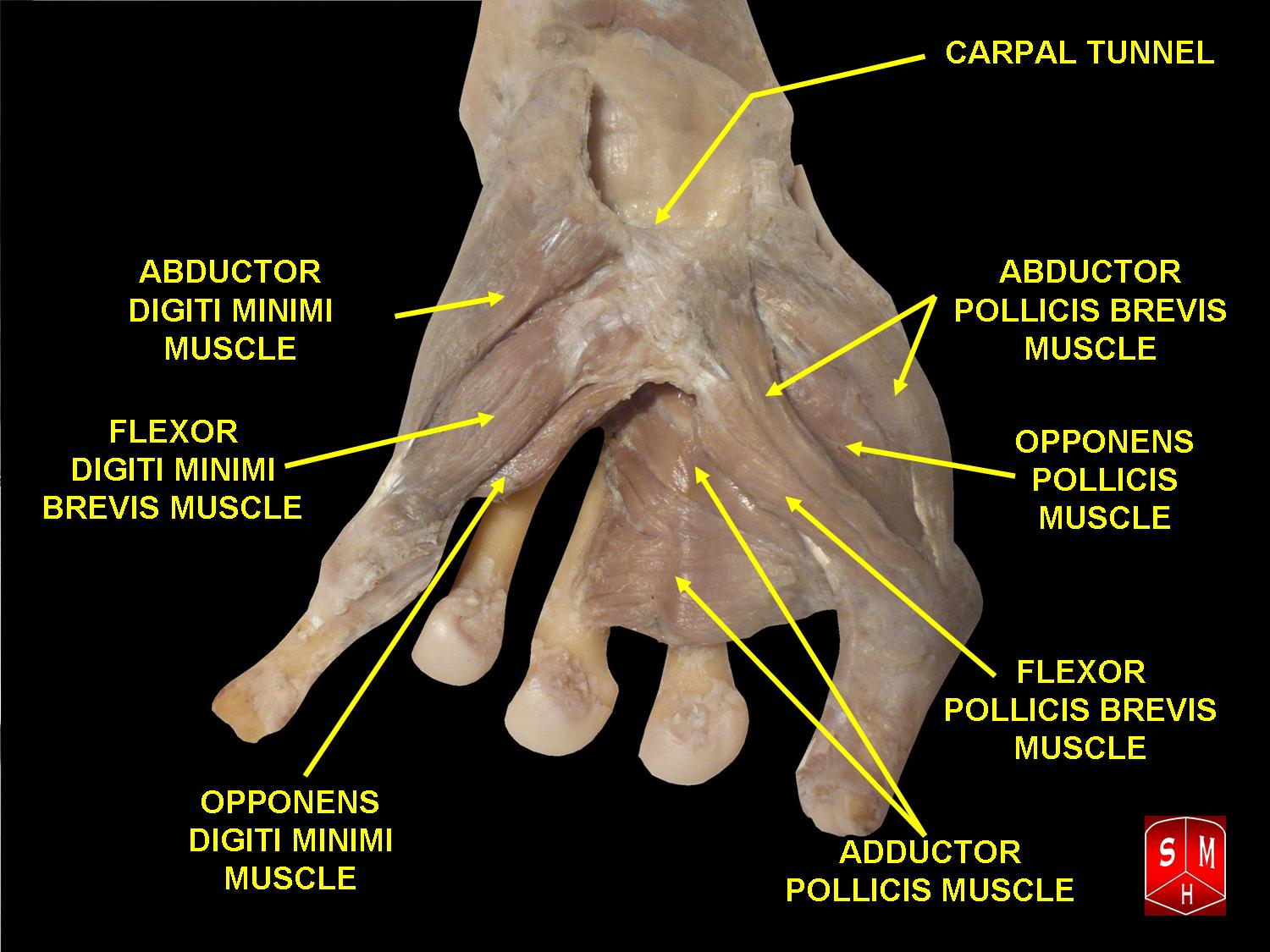
Opponens pollicis muscle

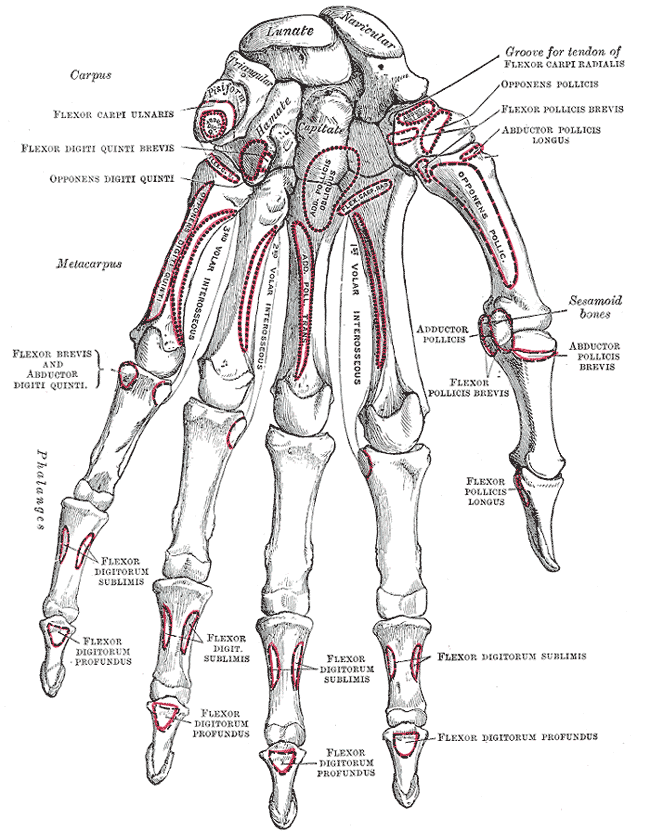
Bones of the left hand. Volar surface.

Transverse section across the wrist and digits.

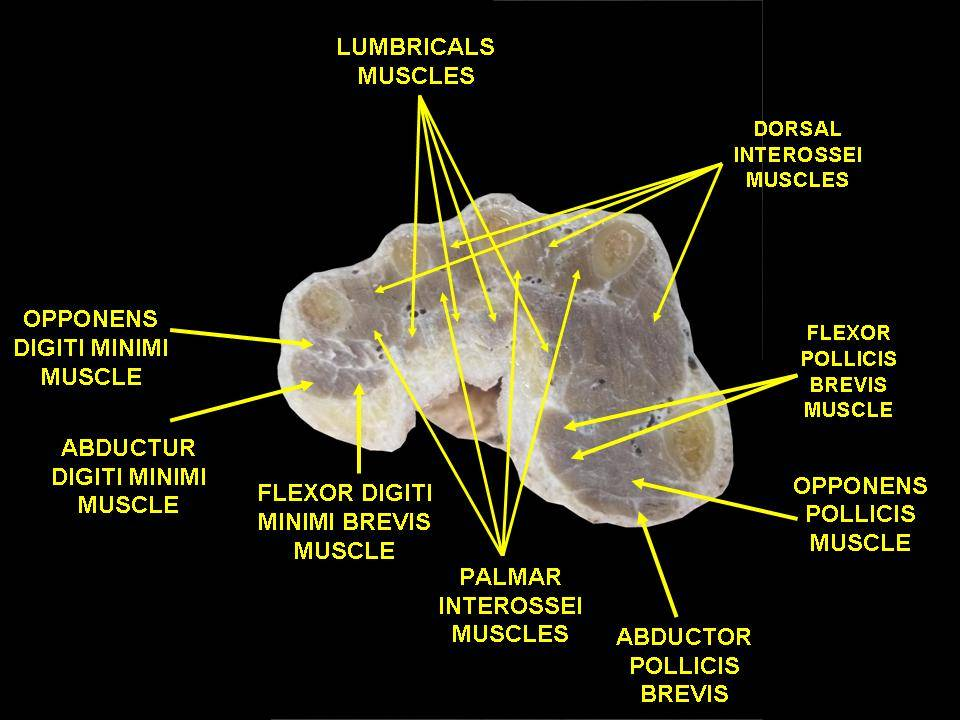
Muscles of hand. Cross section.
