= Trapezium (bone) =

Bone of the wrist

Details
- Articulations: 1st metacarpal distally scaphoid proximally trapezoid medially 2nd metacarpal medially

Identifiers
- Latin: os trapezium, os multangulum majus
- MeSH: D051222
- TA98: A02.4.08.008
- TA2: 1255
- FMA: 23721

The trapezium bone (greater multangular bone) is a carpal bone in the hand. It forms the radial border of the carpal tunnel.

== Structure ==
The trapezium is distinguished by a deep groove on its anterior surface. It is situated at the radial side of the carpus, between the scaphoid and the first metacarpal bone (the metacarpal bone of the thumb). It is homologous with the first distal carpal of reptiles and amphibians.

=== Surfaces ===
The trapezium is an irregular-shaped carpal bone found within the hand. The trapezium is found within the distal row of carpal bones, and is directly adjacent to the metacarpal bone of the thumb. On its ulnar surface are found the trapezoid and scaphoid bones.

The superior surface is directed upward and medialward; medially it is smooth, and articulates with the scaphoid; laterally it is rough and continuous with the lateral surface.

The inferior surface is oval, concave from side to side, convex from before backward, so as to form a saddle-shaped surface for articulation with the base of the first metacarpal bone. This saddle-shaped articulation is partially responsible for the thumb's opposable motion.

The dorsal surface is smooth.

The palmar surface (also anterior aspect) is narrow and rough. At its upper part is a deep groove, running from above obliquely downward and medialward; it transmits the tendon of the Flexor carpi radialis, and is bounded laterally by an oblique ridge. This surface gives origin to the Opponens pollicis and to the Abductor and Flexor pollicis brevis; it also affords attachment to the transverse carpal ligament.

The lateral surface is broad and rough, for the attachment of ligaments.

The medial surface presents two facets; the upper, large and concave, articulates with the trapezoid bone; the lower, small and oval, with the base of the second metacarpal.

=== Tubercle of trapezium ===
The tubercle of trapezium is a tubercle found on the anterior surface of the bone. It is where sometimes abductor pollicis brevis muscle attaches.

== Function ==
The carpal bones function as a unit to provide a bony superstructure for the hand. The trapezium is the most radial of the bones surrounding the carpal tunnel. It is important in thumb movement.

== Clinical relevance ==
The trapezium is susceptible to arthritis at the joint with the metacarpal bone of the thumb, due to overuse.

== Etymology ==
The etymology derives from the Greek trapezion which means "a little table", from trapeza meaning "table", itself from (te)tra- "four" and pod- "foot". The name was first documented in 1840.

== Additional images ==
Trapezium of the left hand.

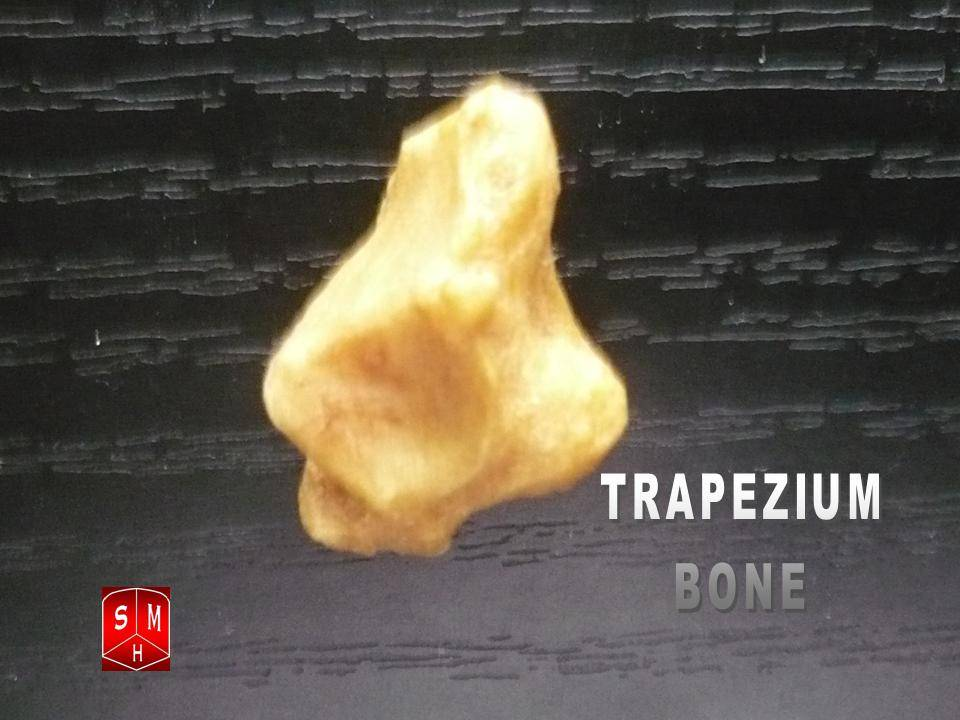
Trapezium bone.

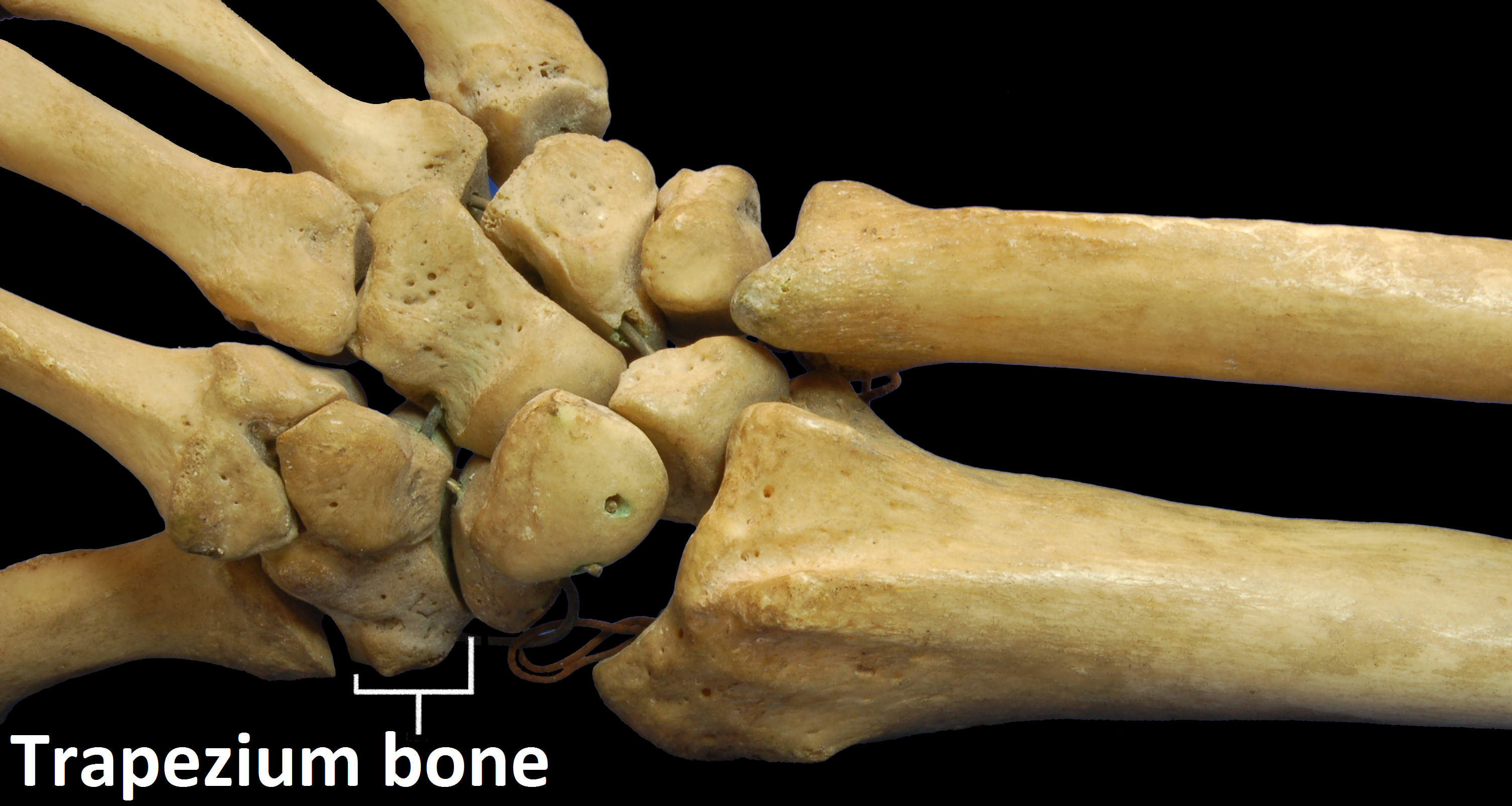
Right hand posterior view (dorsal view). Thumb on bottom.

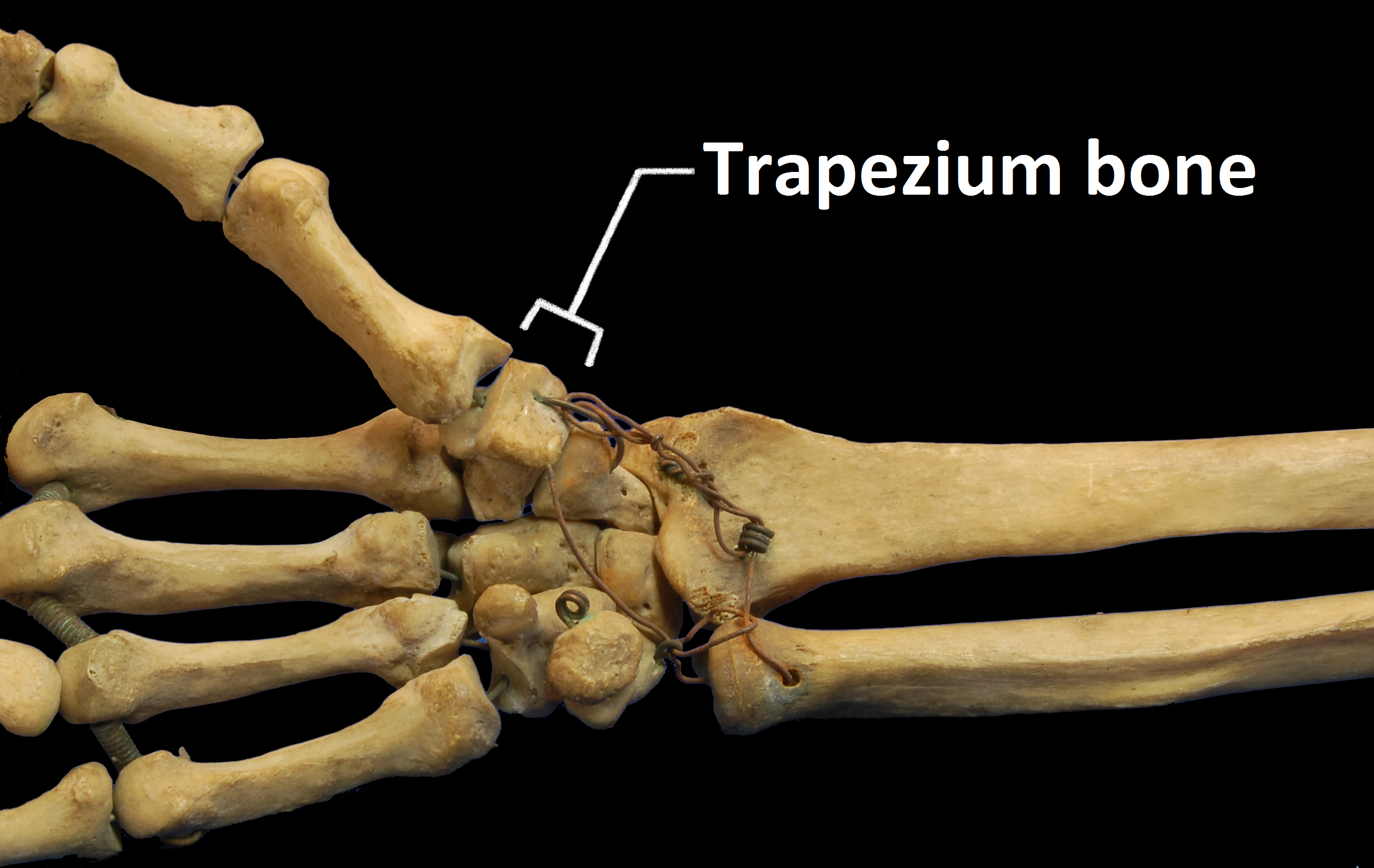
Right hand anterior view (palmar view). Thumb on top.

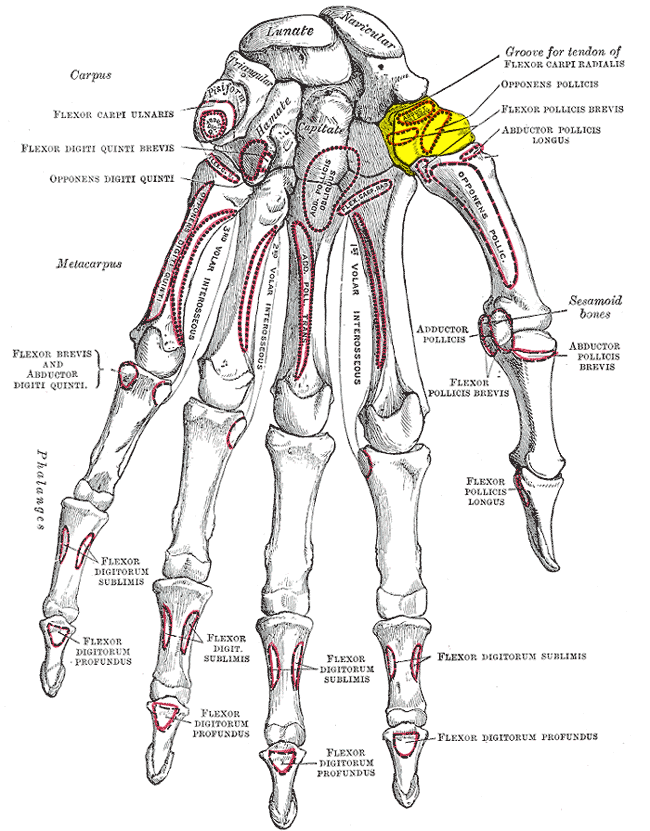
Bones of the left hand. Palmar surface. Trapezium shown in yellow.

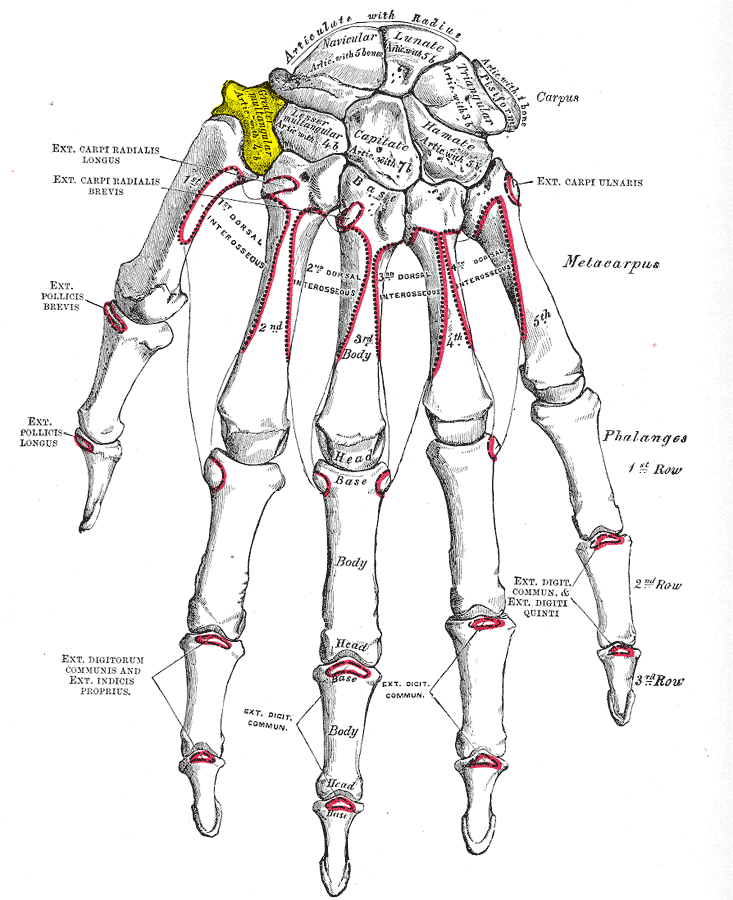
Bones of the left hand. Dorsal surface. Trapezium shown in yellow.

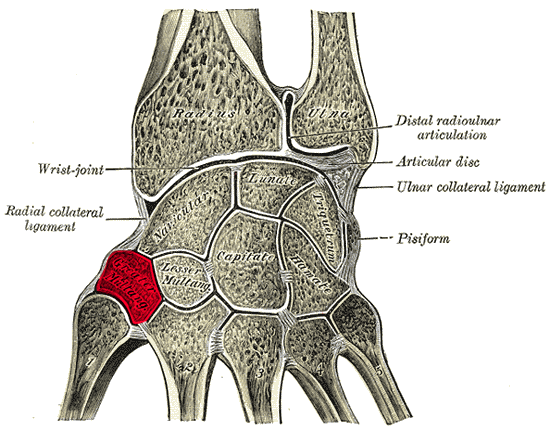
Cross section of wrist (thumb on left). Trapezium shown in red (labelled as "Greater Multang").

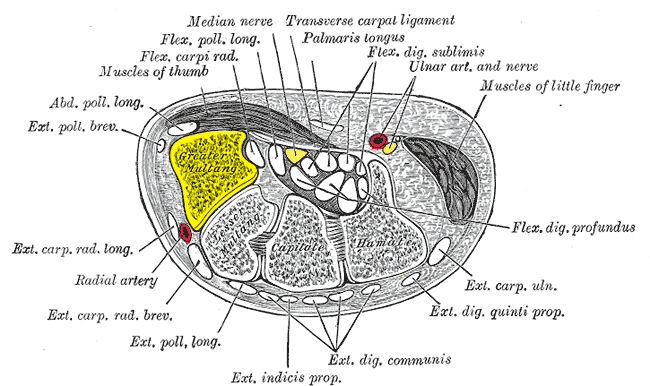
Transverse section across the wrist and digits. Trapezium is shown in yellow (labelled as "Greater Multang").

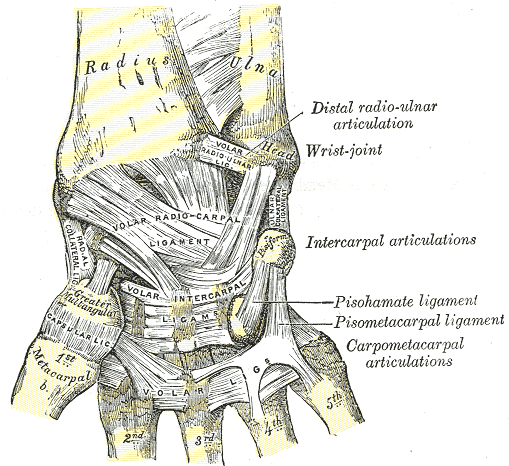
Ligaments of wrist. Anterior view

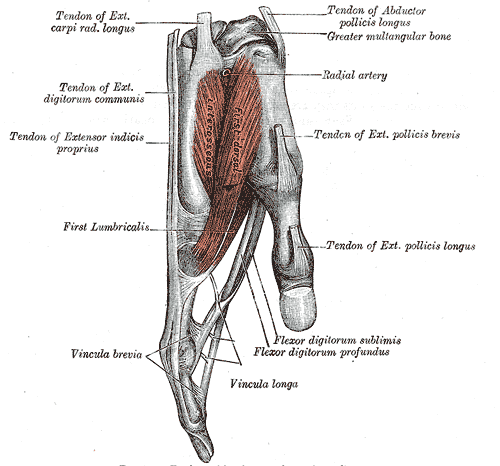
Tendons of forefinger and vincula tendina.

== See also ==
- Carpal bone
- Finger
- Hand
