= Contrahens =

Uscles widely present in the hands of mammals

The contrahentes (singular contrahens) are muscles widely present in the hands of mammals, including monkeys. They are on the palmar/plantar side. There is one each for digits I, II, IV and V, but not III. They pull the fingers/toes down and together.

== Human anatomy ==
In humans, the adductor pollicis muscle in the hand and the adductor hallucis in the foot are well-developed remnants of the first contrahens, though they have lost the insertion on the distal phalanx of the thumb or big toe. The other contrahentes only appear as rare atavistic abnormalities. In other mammals, the contrahentes may have their origin either on the carpus or the metacarpus, which suggests that the palmar interossei muscles also contain elements of the contrahentes. They appear in the human fetus as a layer of flesh that mostly disappears.

== In other animals ==
The contrahens of the fourth digit is absent in dogs but present in cats and rabbits.

In primates, the contrahentes vary in number between zero and four. By their insertion onto the proximal phalanges they facilitate convergence of the digits.

In tarsiers, they facilitate the grip by increasing the pressure between the large distal pads and the gripped surface by simultaneously flexing the metacarpophalangeal joints and the proximal interphalangeal joints and extending the distal interphalangeal joints.
