= Thenar eminence =

Mound at the base of the thumb formed by the intrinsic group of muscles

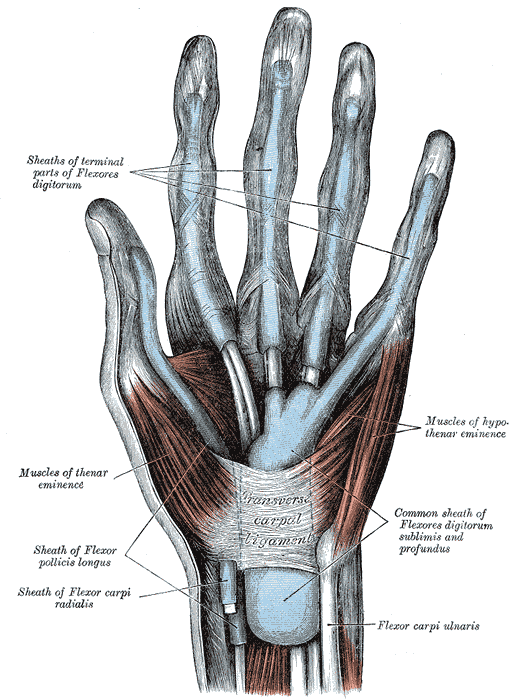
- The mucous sheaths of the tendons on the anterior surface of the wrist and digits

- Transverse section across the wrist and digits (muscles of thumb labeled at upper left)

Details
- Artery: Superficial palmar arch
- Nerve: Median nerve
- Actions: Control movement of the thumb

Identifiers
- Latin: eminentia thenaris
- TA98: A01.2.07.023
- TA2: 306
- FMA: 61520

The thenar eminence is the mound formed at the base of the thumb on the palm of the hand by the intrinsic group of muscles of the thumb. The skin overlying this region is the area stimulated when trying to elicit a palmomental reflex. The word thenar comes from Ancient Greek θέναρ (thenar) 'palm of the hand'.

== Structure ==
The following three muscles are considered part of the thenar eminence:

- Abductor pollicis brevis abducts the thumb. This muscle is the most superficial of the thenar group.
- Flexor pollicis brevis, which lies next to the abductor, will flex the thumb, curling it up in the palm. (The flexor pollicis longus, which is inserted into the distal phalanx of the thumb, is not considered part of the thenar eminence.)
- Opponens pollicis lies deep to abductor pollicis brevis. As its name suggests it opposes the thumb, bringing it against the fingers. This is a very important movement, as most of human hand dexterity comes from this action.

Another muscle that controls movement of the thumb is adductor pollicis. It lies deeper and more distal to flexor pollicis brevis. Despite the name, adductor pollicis is chiefly responsible for rotation and opposition. This muscle is not in the thenar group of muscles, and is supplied by the ulnar nerve instead.

=== Nerve supply ===
The opponens pollicis and abductor pollicis brevis are normally innervated by the recurrent branch of the median nerve.

The flexor pollicis brevis has two heads: a superficial and a deep head. The superficial head is usually innervated by the recurrent branch of the median nerve. The deep part is often innervated by the deep branch of ulnar nerve (C8 and T1 roots).

There are normal variations. In a Cannieu-Riche anastomosis, fibers from the deep branch of ulnar nerve innervate the opponens pollicis and/or abductor pollicis brevis. Regardless of their final innervation, the nerves that reach the thenar muscles arise from the C8 and T1 roots, pass through the lower trunk of the brachial plexus, and then through the medial cord of the plexus.

The adductor pollicis is typically innervated by the ulnar nerve.

The ulnar nerve is exclusively responsible for the innervations of the hypothenar eminence. Both nerves contribute to the innervations of the midpalmar group.

The innervation of these muscles by the median nerve is unusual, as most of the intrinsic muscles on the palm of the hand are supplied by the ulnar nerve. The lateral two lumbrical muscles are the other exception.

== Additional images ==
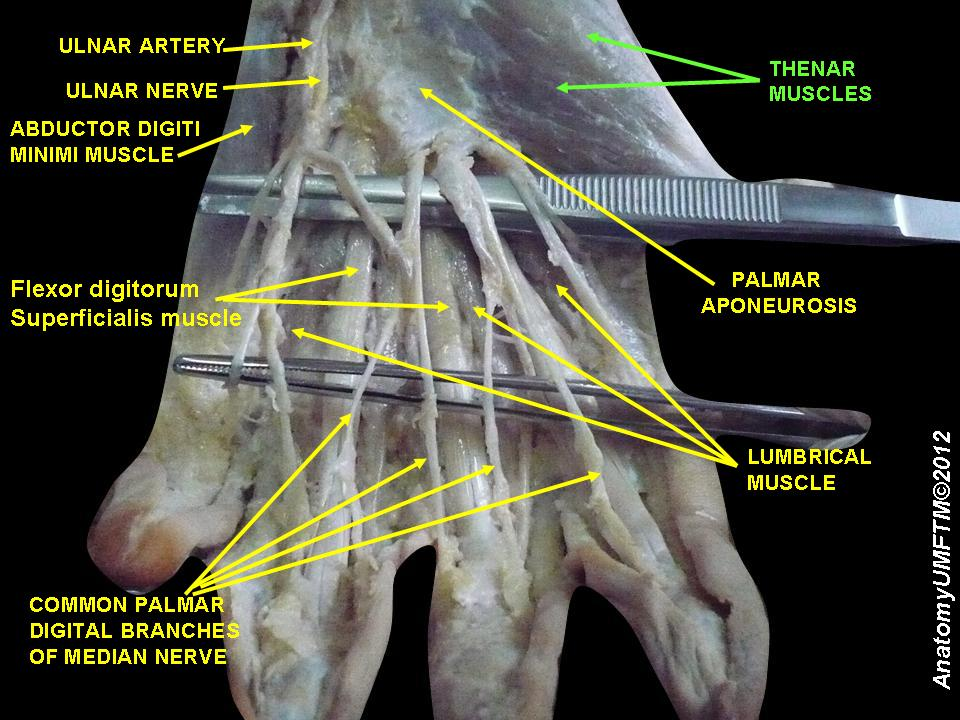
Thenar eminence

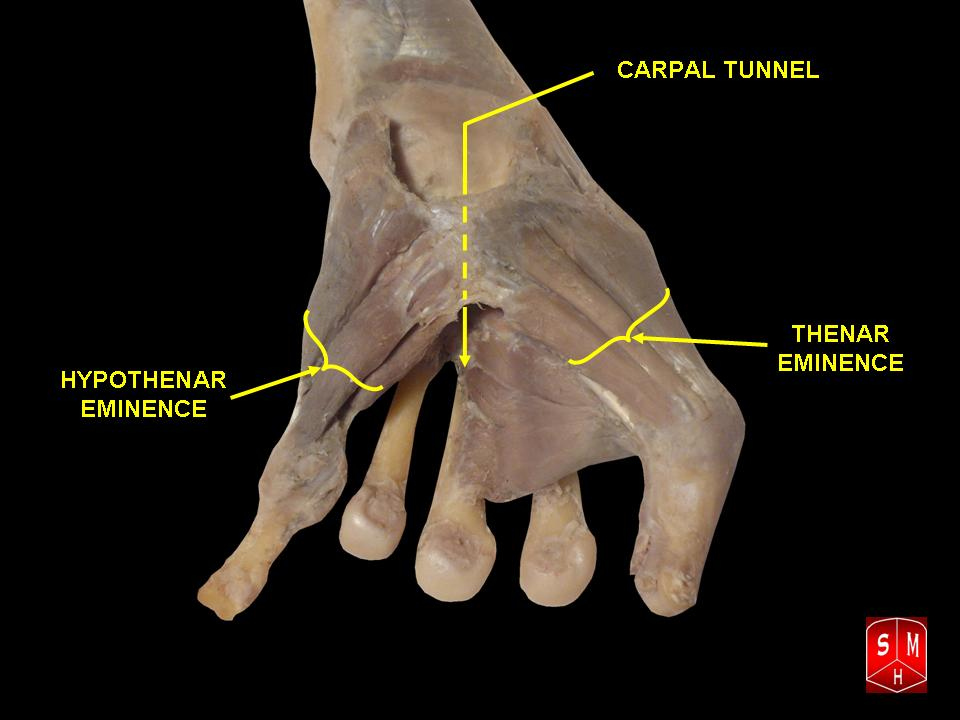
Carpal tunnel and thenar and hypothenar eminences

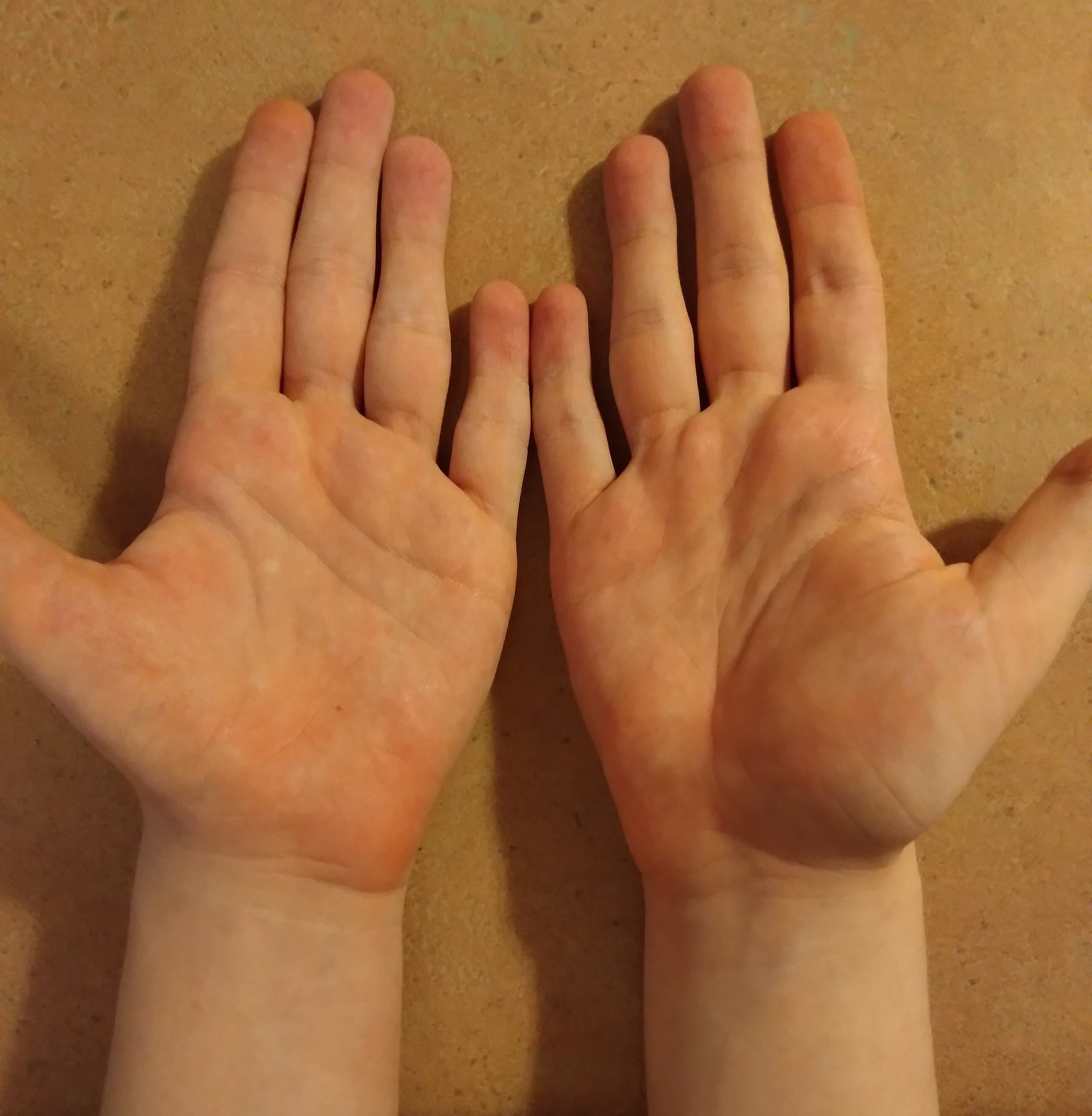
Comparison, anterior

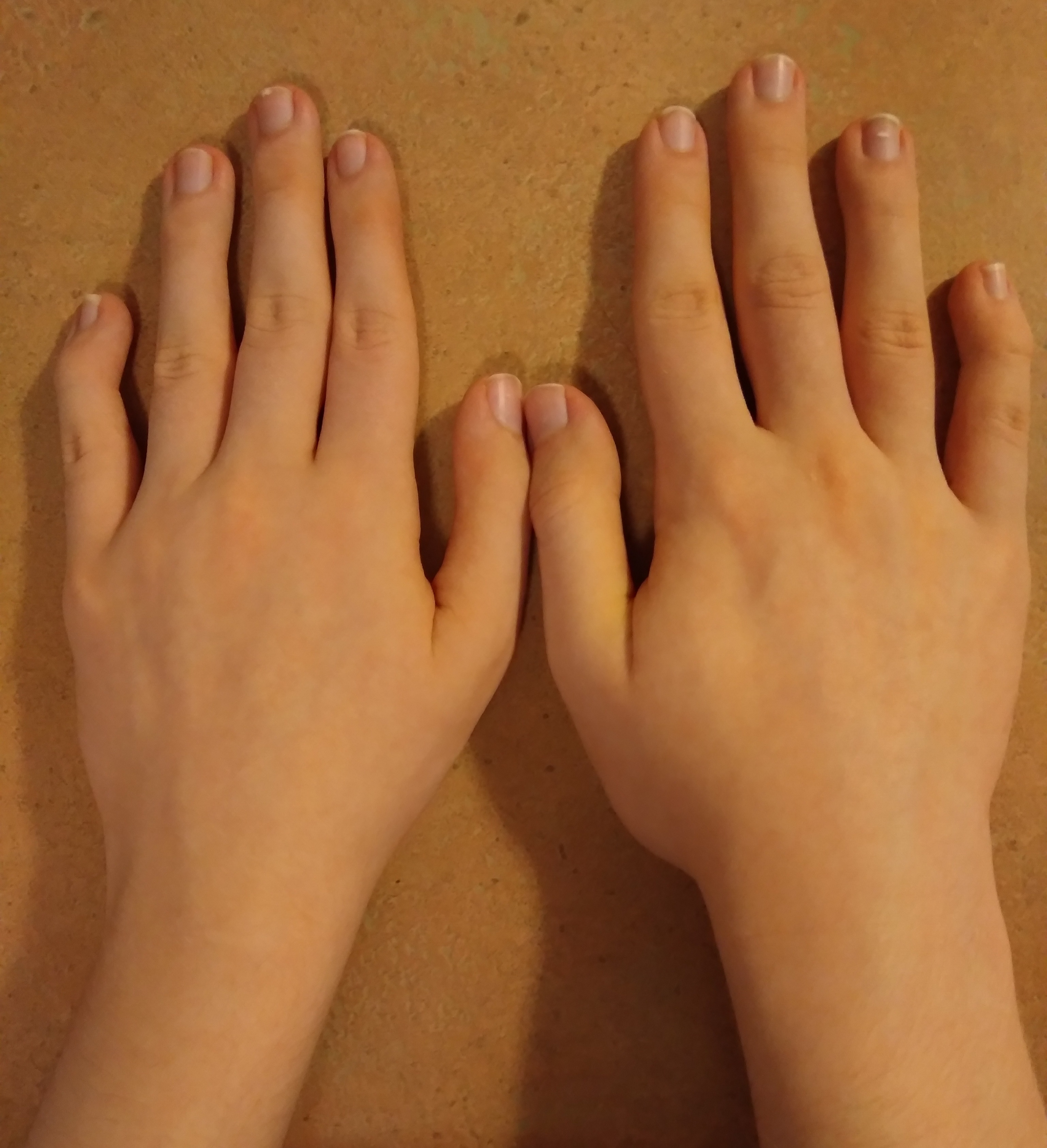
Comparison, posterior

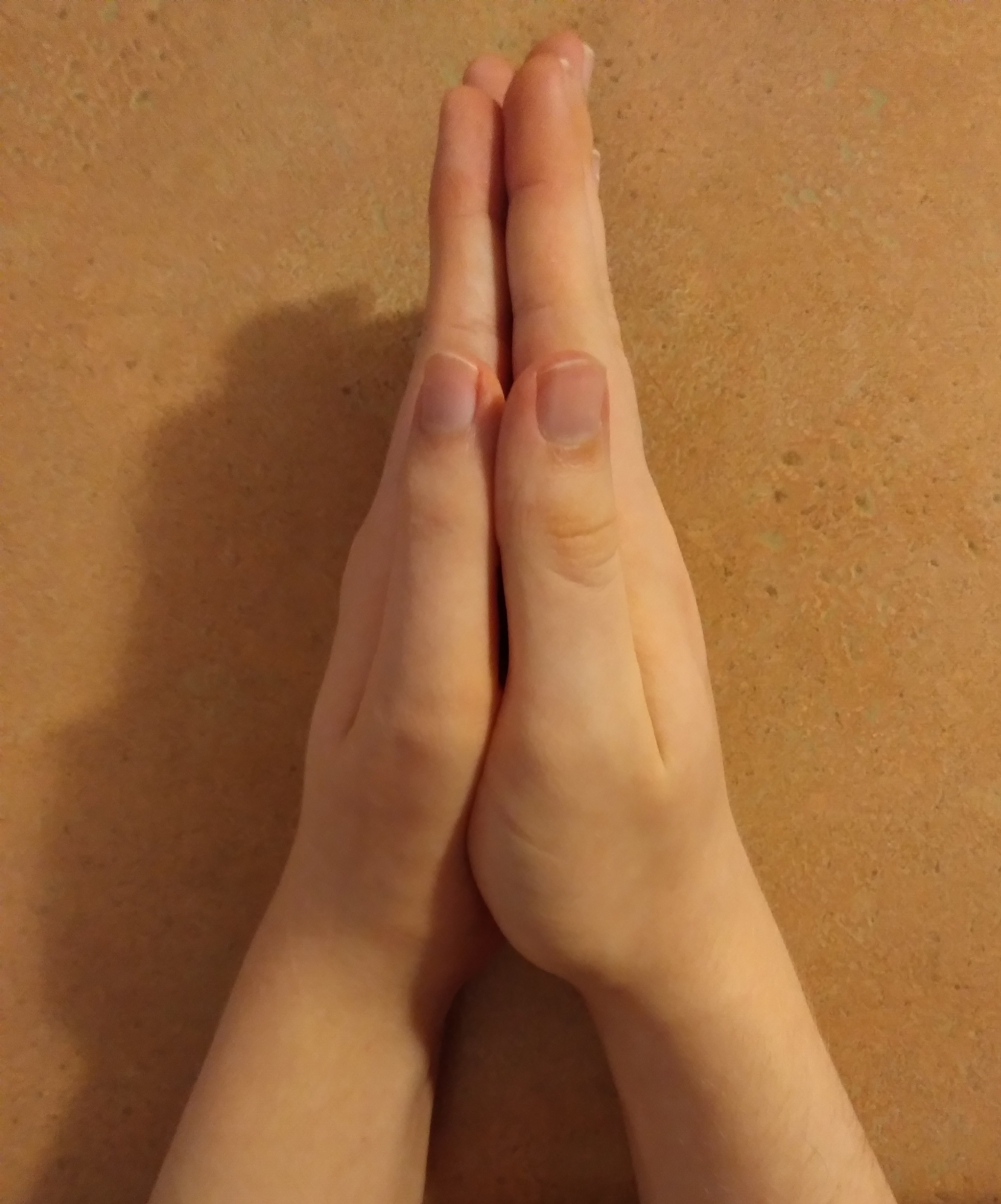
Comparison facing thumbs

== See also ==
- Hypothenar eminence
