= Abductor pollicis brevis muscle =

Muscle of the thumb

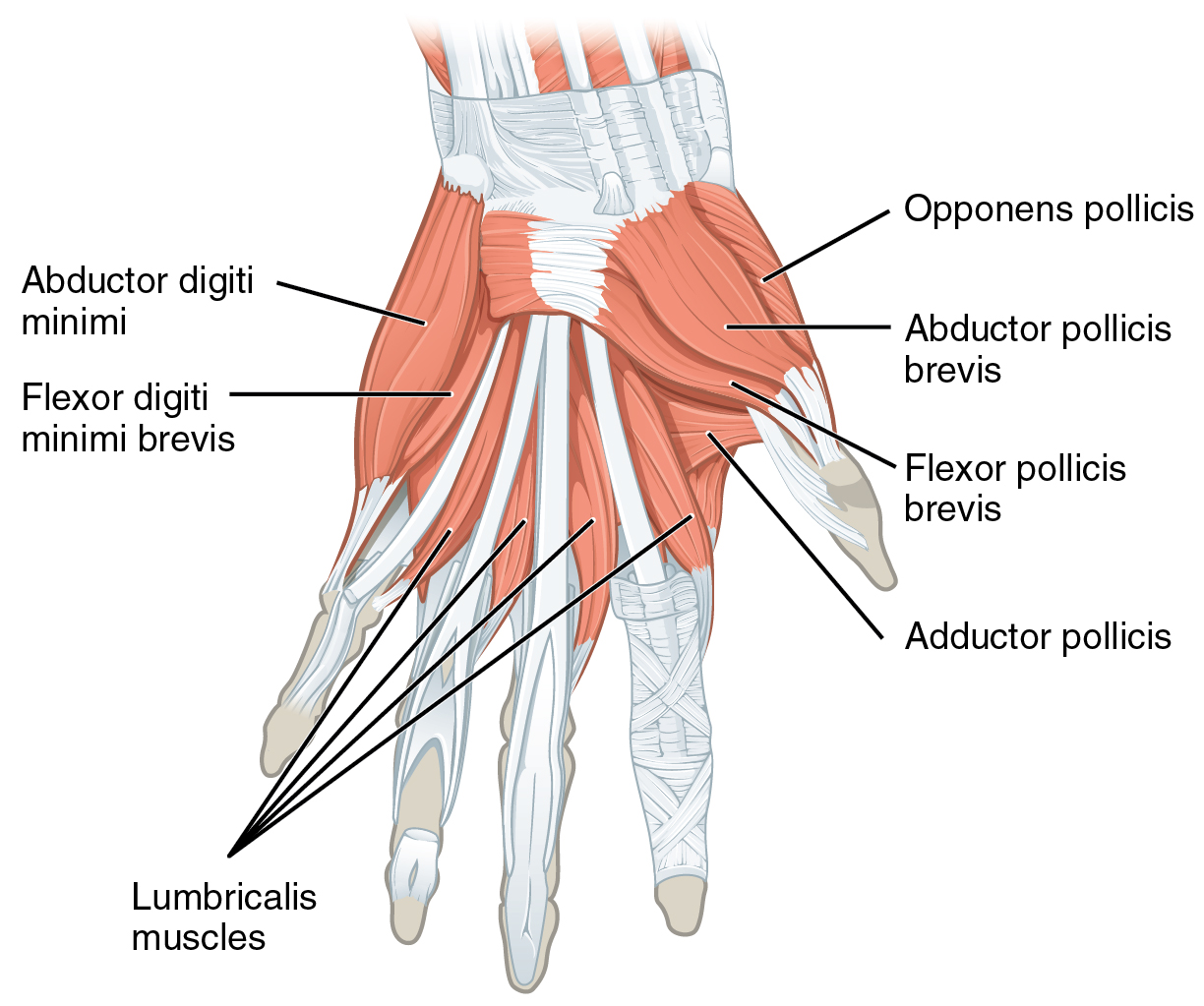
- Superficial muscles of the left hand, palmar view

Details
- Origin: Transverse carpal ligament, the scaphoid and trapezium
- Insertion: Base of the proximal phalanx of thumb
- Artery: Superficial palmar arch
- Nerve: Recurrent branch of the median nerve
- Actions: Abduction of the thumb by acting across the carpometacarpal joint and the metacarpophalangeal joint. It also assists in opposition and extension of the thumb.
- Antagonist: Adductor pollicis muscle

Identifiers
- Latin: musculus abductor pollicis brevis
- TA98: A04.6.02.054
- TA2: 2521
- FMA: 37373

The abductor pollicis brevis is a muscle in the hand that functions as an abductor of the thumb.

== Structure ==
The abductor pollicis brevis is a flat, thin muscle located just under the skin. It is a thenar muscle, and therefore contributes to the bulk of the palm's thenar eminence.

It originates from the flexor retinaculum of the hand, the tubercle of the scaphoid bone, and additionally sometimes from the tubercle of the trapezium.

Running lateralward and downward, it is inserted by a thin, flat tendon into the lateral side of the base of the first phalanx of the thumb, and the capsule of the metacarpophalangeal joint.

=== Nerve supply ===
The abductor pollicis brevis is supplied by the recurrent branch of the median nerve (Roots C8-T1).

== Function ==
Abduction of the thumb is defined as the movement of the thumb anteriorly, a direction perpendicular to the palm. The abductor pollicis brevis does this by acting across both the carpometacarpal joint and the metacarpophalangeal joint.

It also assists in opposition and extension of the thumb.

== Additional images ==
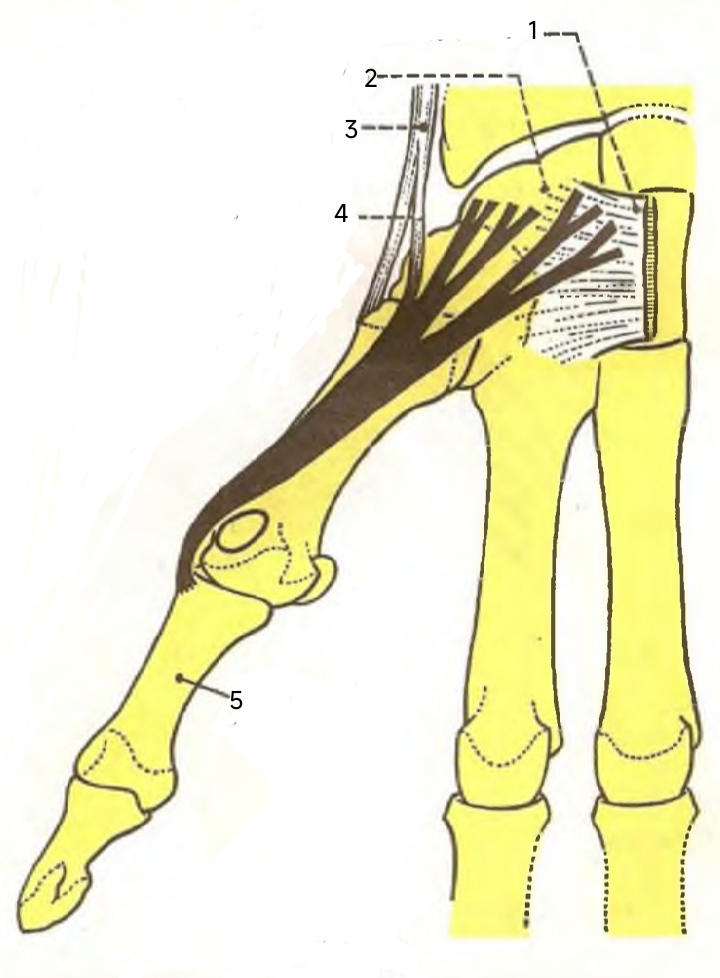
Anatomical sketch showing the constitution of the abductor pollicis brevis. (From Testut's Anatomy.)

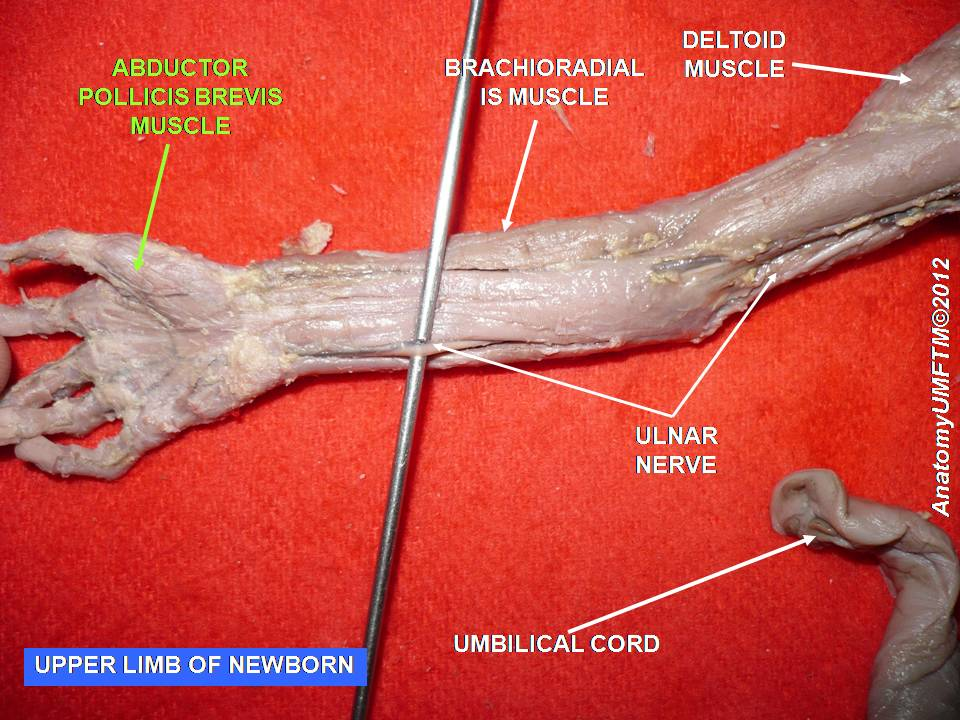
Cadaver dissection
