= Flexor pollicis brevis muscle =

Muscle in the thenar compartment

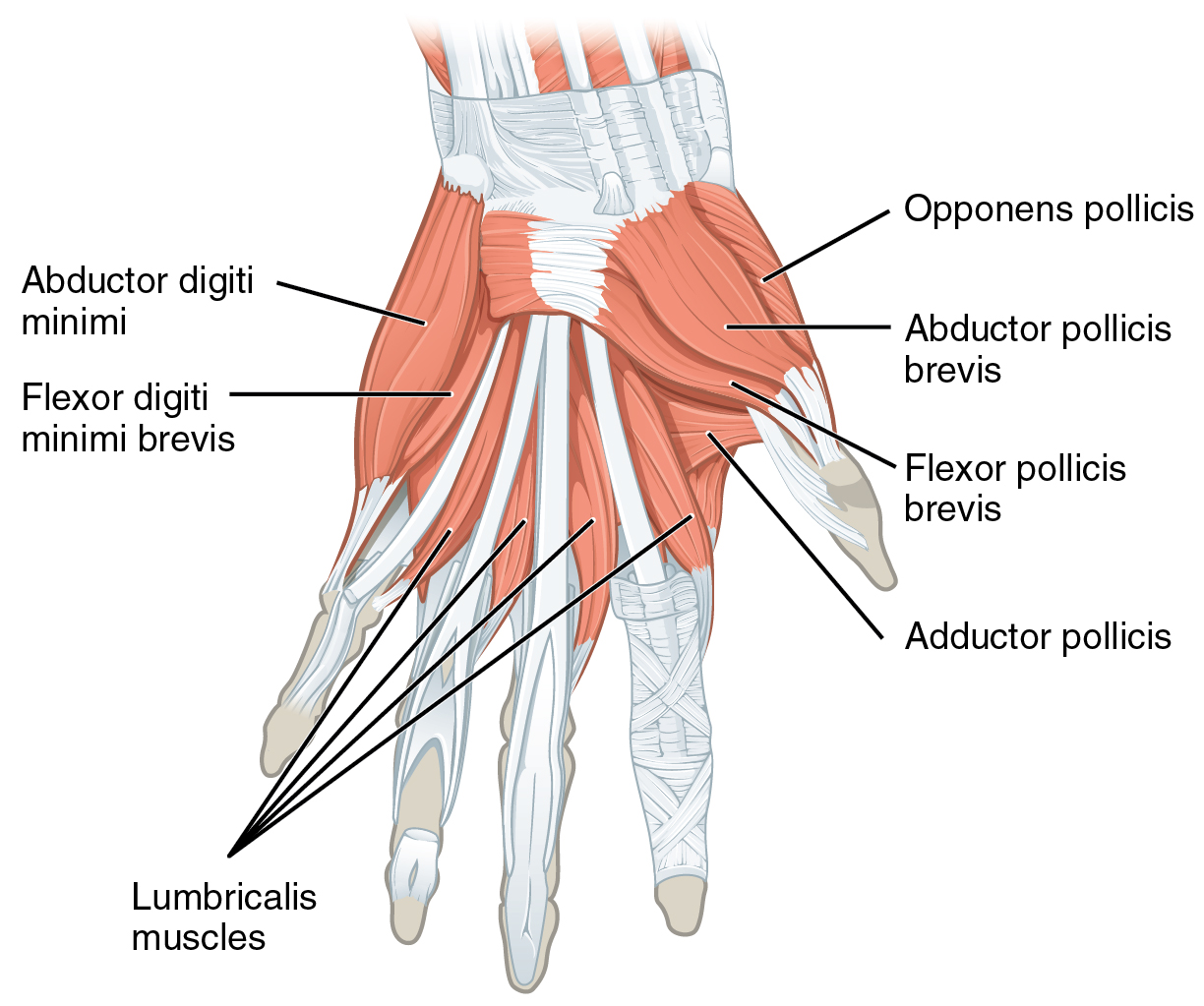
- Superficial muscles of the left hand, palmar view.

Details
- Origin: Trapezium, flexor retinaculum
- Insertion: Thumb, proximal phalanx
- Artery: Superficial palmar arch
- Nerve: Recurrent branch of the median nerve, deep branch of ulnar nerve (medial head)
- Actions: Flexes the thumb at the first metacarpophalangeal joint
- Antagonist: Extensor pollicis longus and brevis

Identifiers
- Latin: musculus flexor pollicis brevis
- TA98: A04.6.02.055
- TA2: 2522
- FMA: 37378

The flexor pollicis brevis is a muscle in the hand that flexes the thumb. It is one of three thenar muscles. It has both a superficial part and a deep part.

== Origin and insertion ==
The muscle's superficial head arises from the outer two-thirds of the lower (distal) edge of the flexor retinaculum and the tubercle of the trapezium, the most lateral bone in the distal row of carpal bones. It passes along the outer (radial) side of the tendon of the flexor pollicis longus.

The deeper (and medial) head "varies in size and may be absent." It arises from the trapezoid and capitate bones on the floor of the carpal tunnel, as well as the ligaments of the distal carpal row.

Both heads become tendinous and insert together into the outer (radial) side of the base of the first phalanx of the thumb; at the junction between the tendinous heads there is a sesamoid bone (the so-called flexor sesamoid).

== Innervation ==
The superficial head is usually innervated by the lateral terminal branch of the median nerve. The deep part is often innervated by the deep branch of the ulnar nerve (C8, T1).

== Blood supply ==
The flexor pollicis brevis receives its blood supply from the superficial palmar branches of radial artery.

== Action ==
The flexor pollicis brevis flexes the thumb at the metacarpophalangeal joint, as well as flexion and medial rotation of the 1st metacarpal bone at the carpometacarpal joint.

== Pathology ==
Flexor pollicis brevis can, rarely, be completely absent at birth due to a congenital issue (as can the other muscles of the thenar eminence).

== Additional images ==
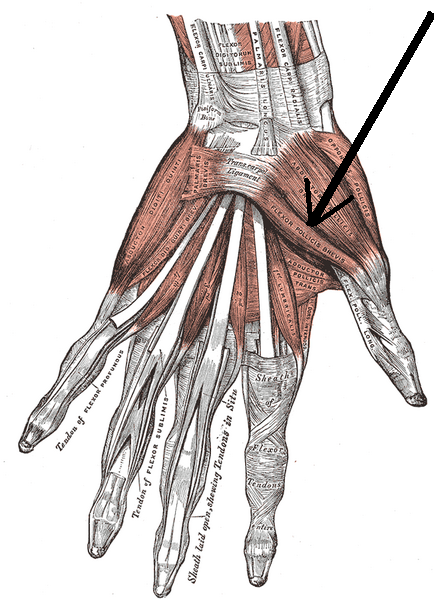
The muscles of the left hand. Palmar surface. (Flexor pollicis brevis visible at center right, near thumb.)

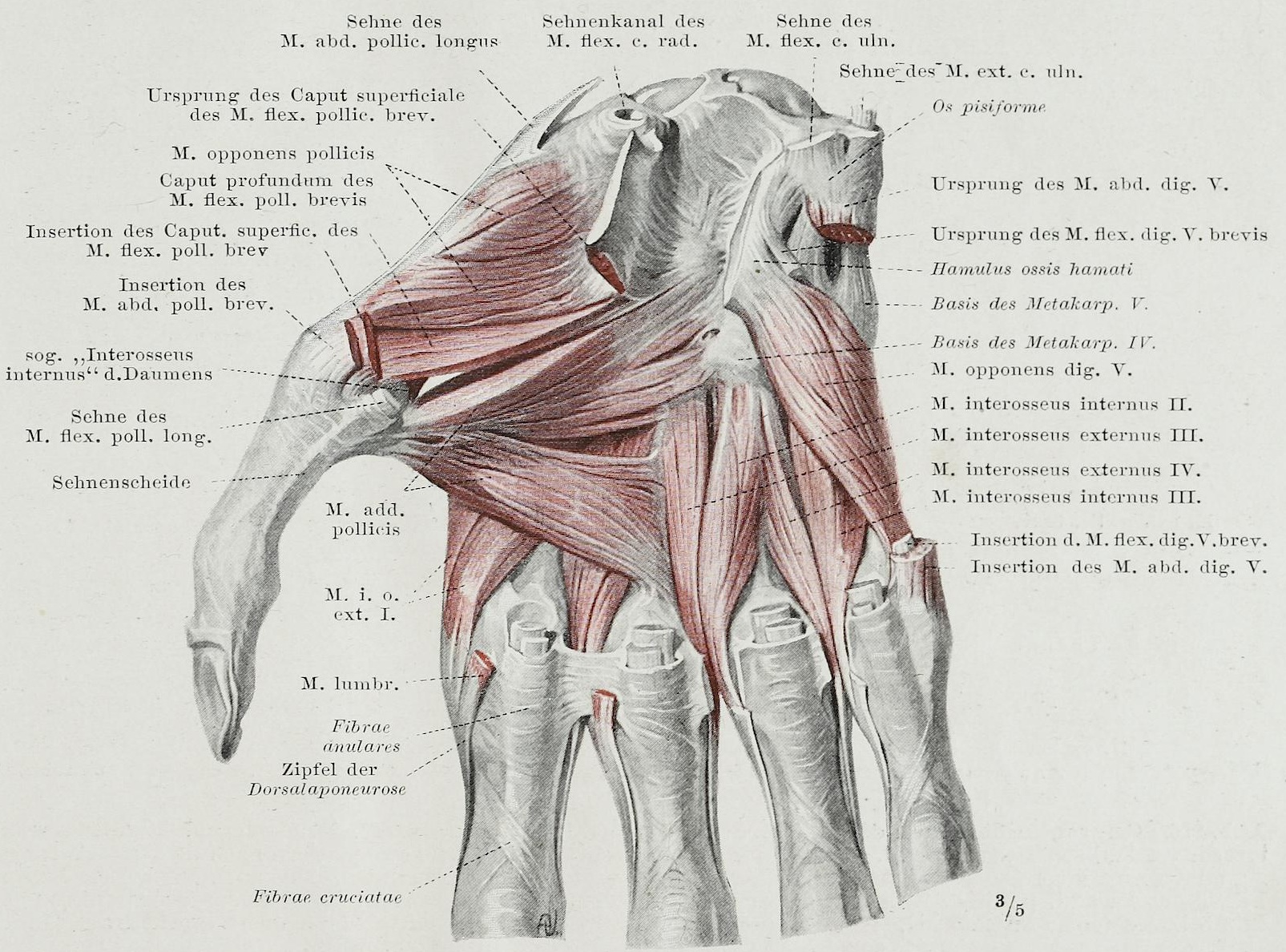
Caput profundum of the Flexor pollicis brevis muscle

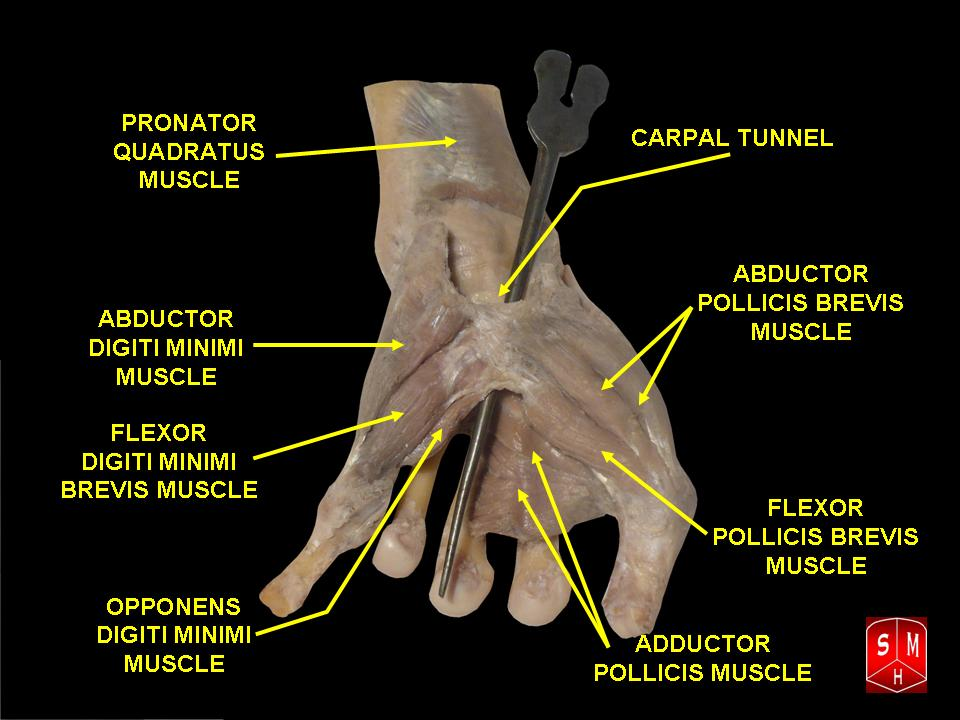
Flexor pollicis brevis muscle

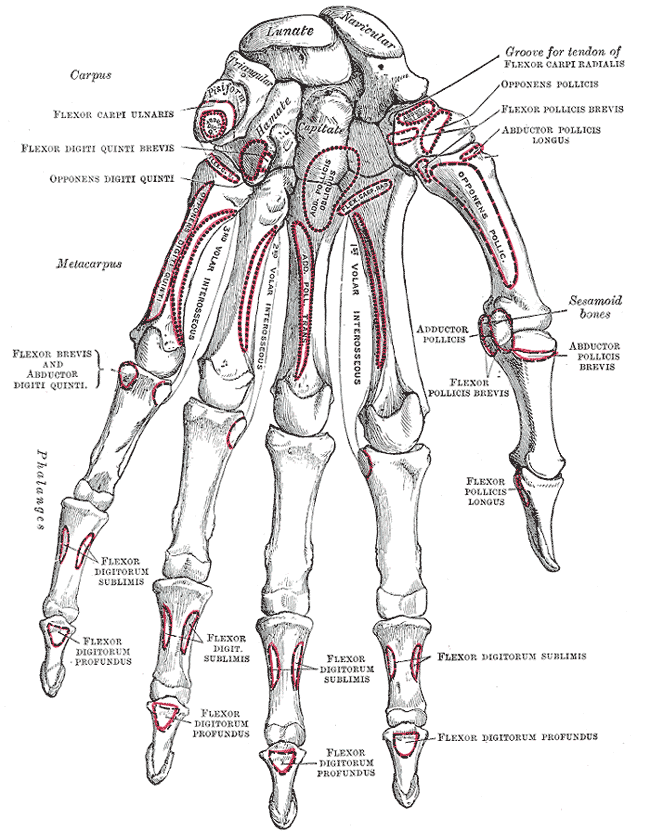
Bones of the left hand. Volar surface.

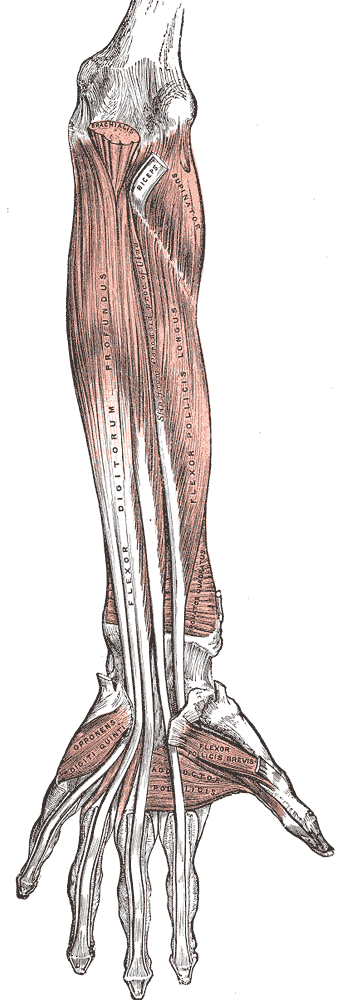
Front of the left forearm. Deep muscles.

Transverse section across the wrist and digits.

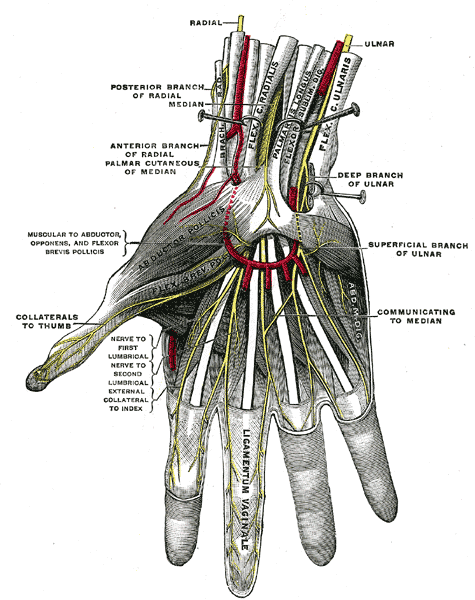
Superficial palmar nerves.

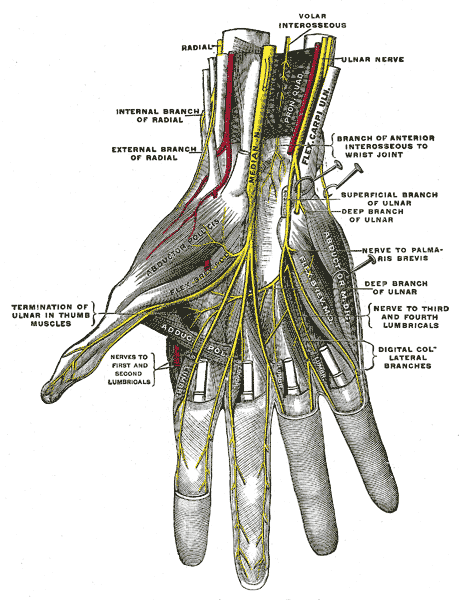
Deep palmar nerves.

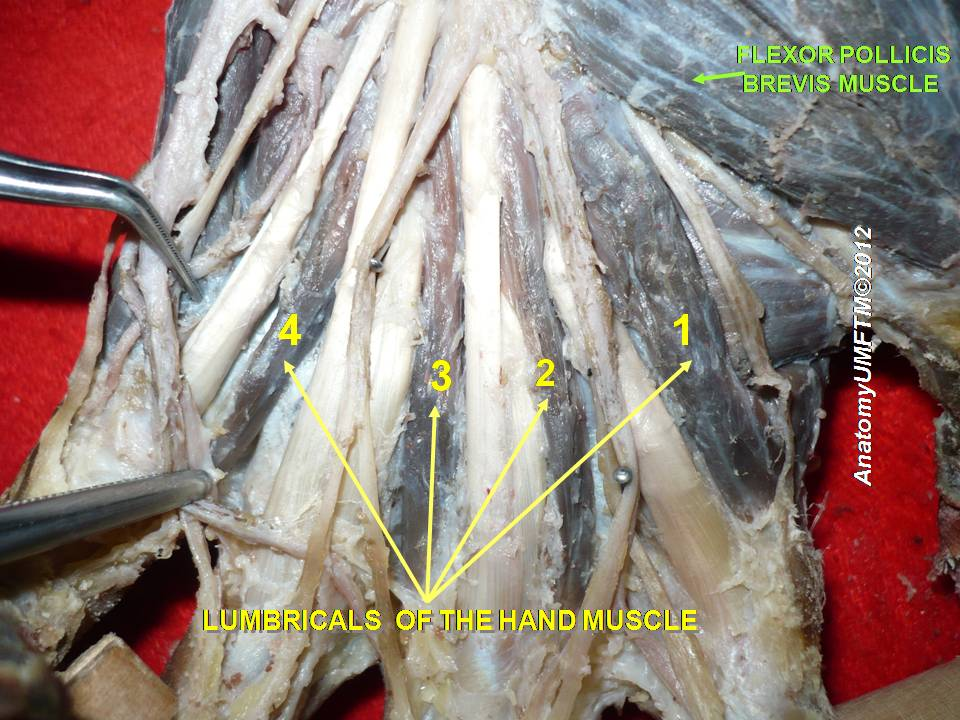
Flexor pollicis brevis muscle

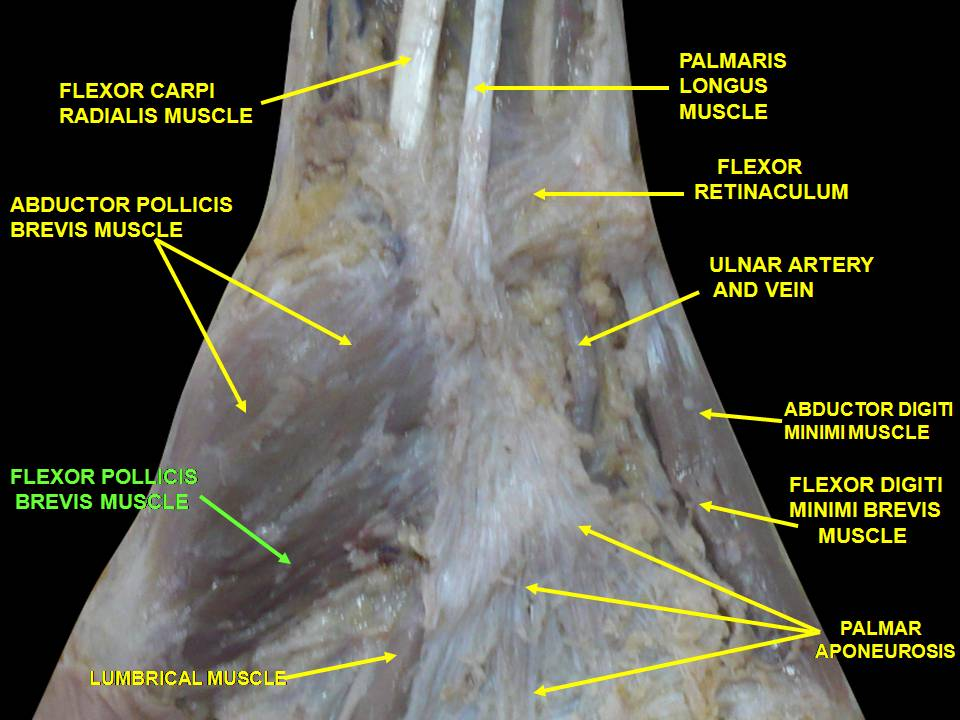
Flexor pollicis brevis muscle

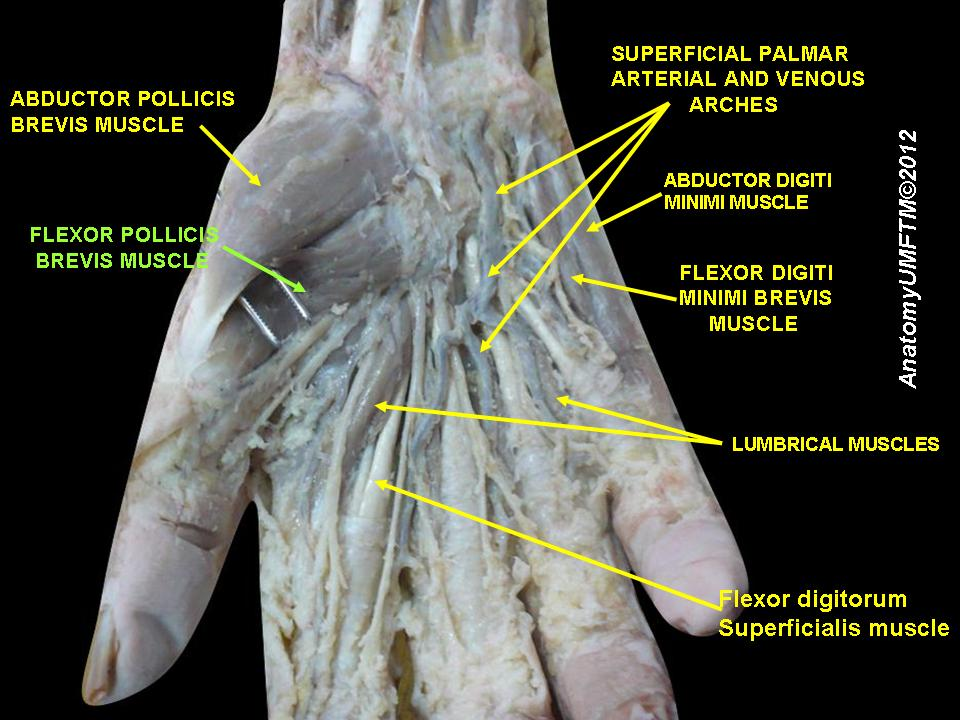
Flexor pollicis brevis muscle

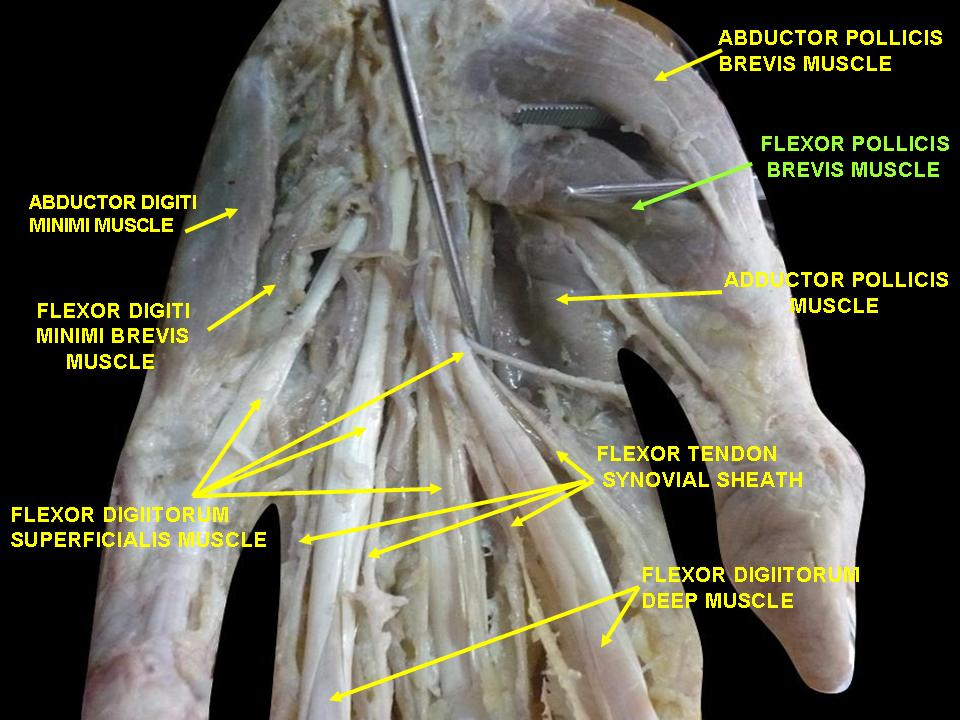
Flexor pollicis brevis muscle

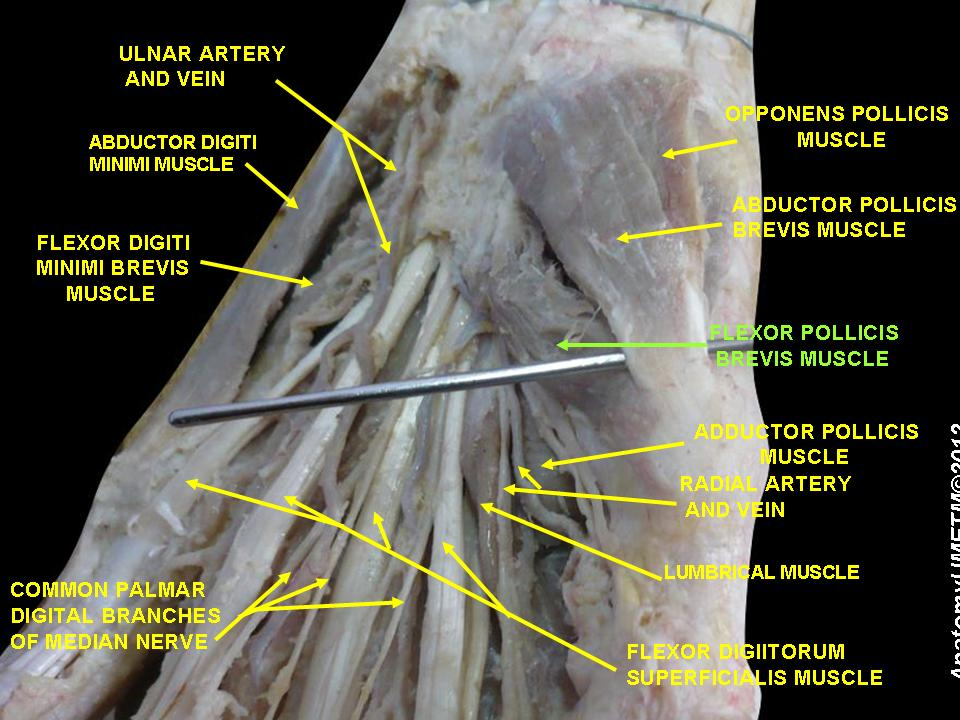
Flexor pollicis brevis muscle

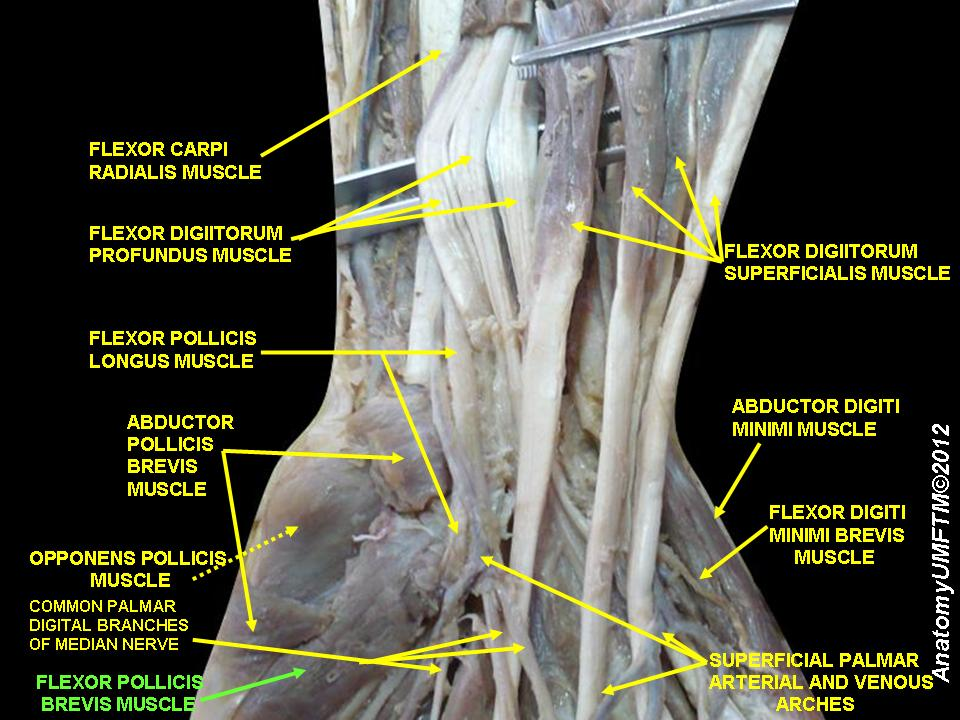
Flexor pollicis brevis muscle

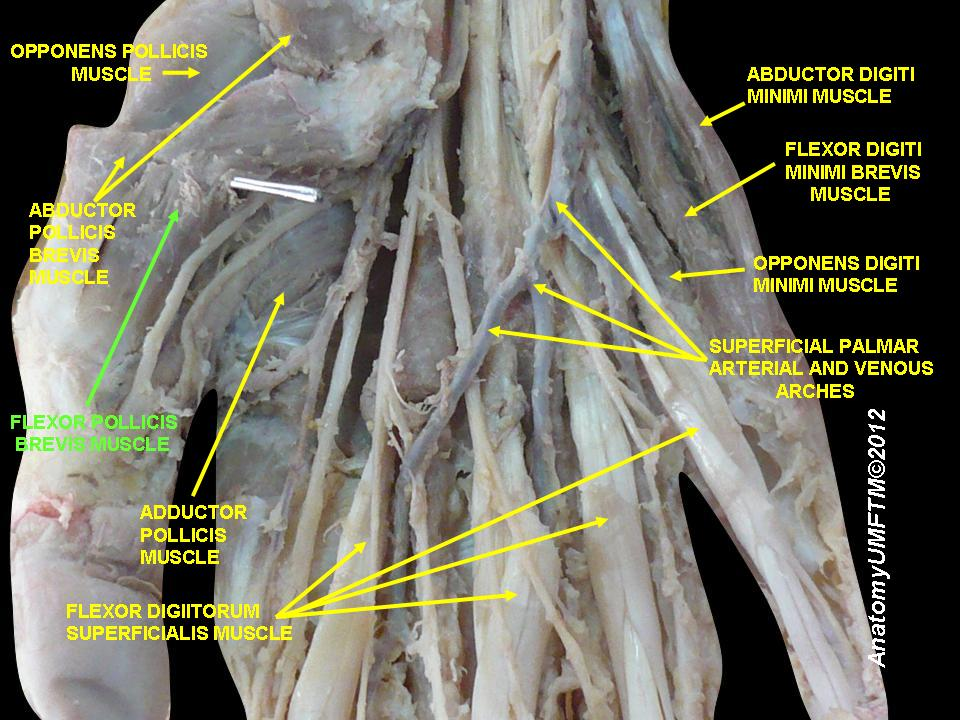
Flexor pollicis brevis muscle

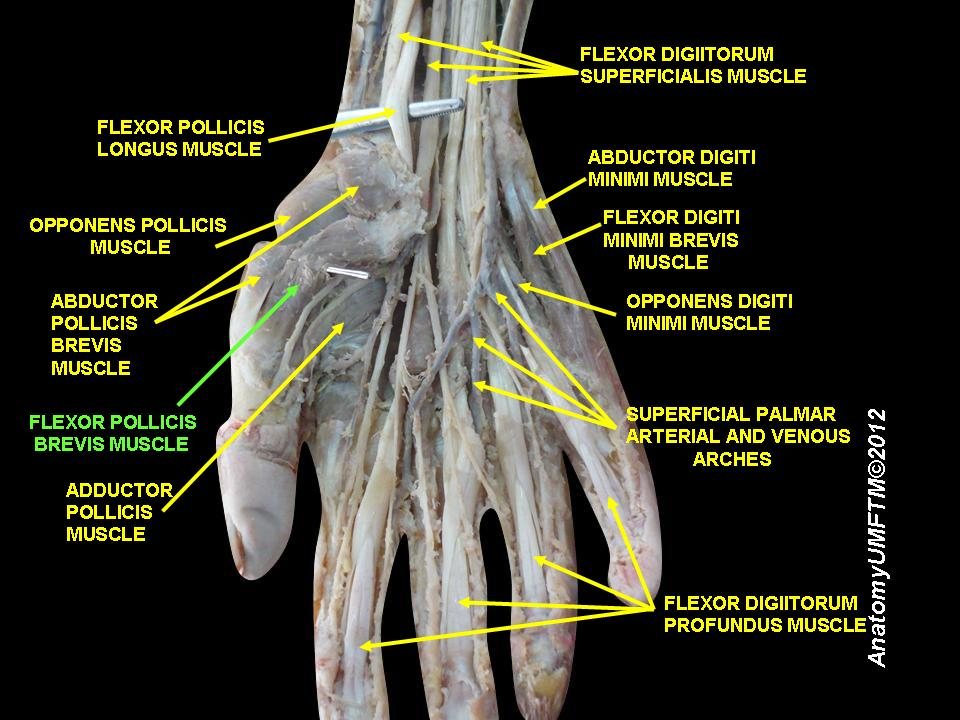
Flexor pollicis brevis muscle

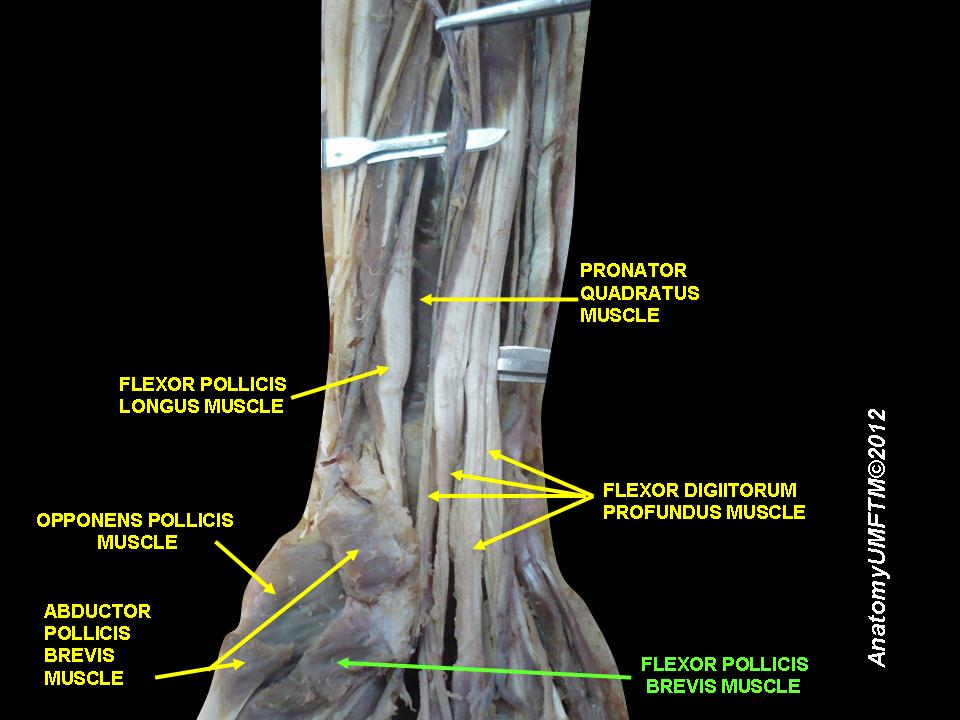
Flexor pollicis brevis muscle

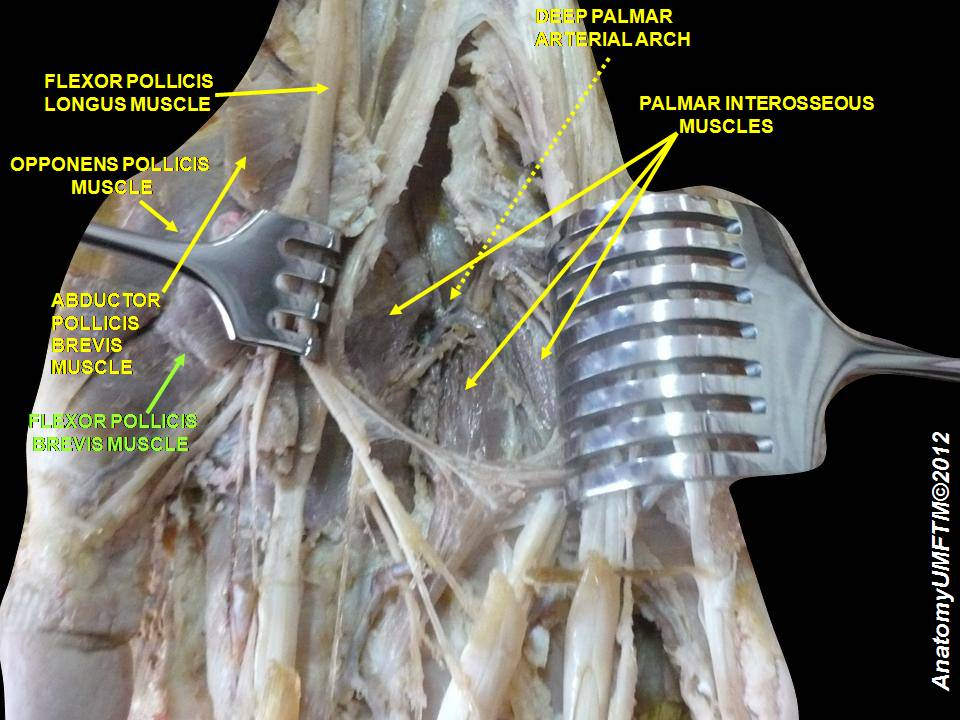
Flexor pollicis brevis muscle

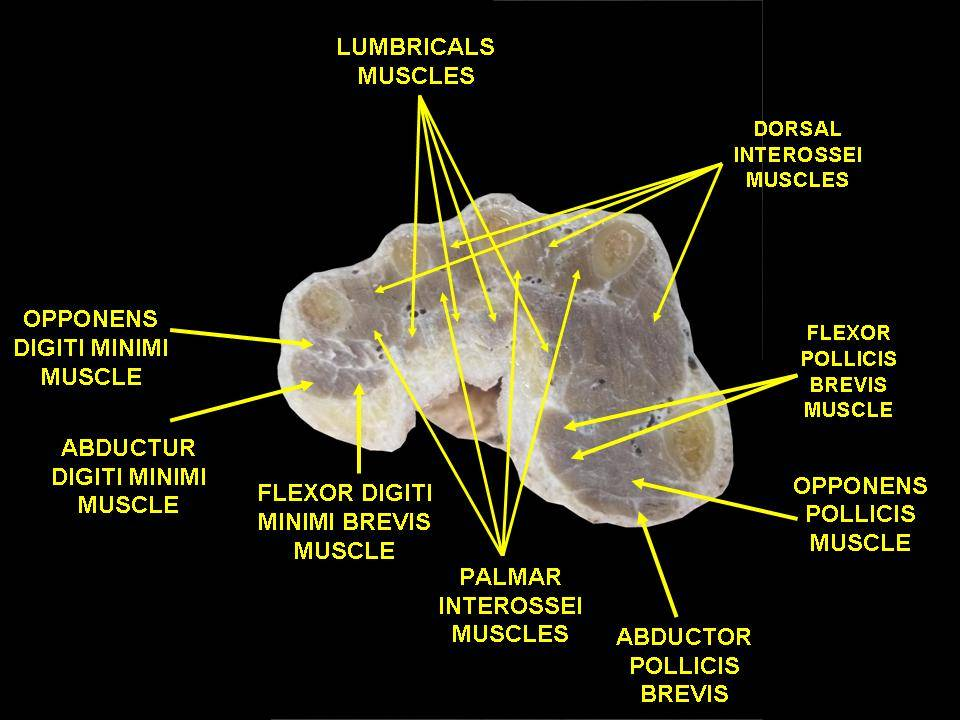
Muscles of hand. Cross section.
