= Flexor digiti minimi brevis muscle of hand =

Muscle in the hypothenar compartment

Flexor digiti minimi brevis
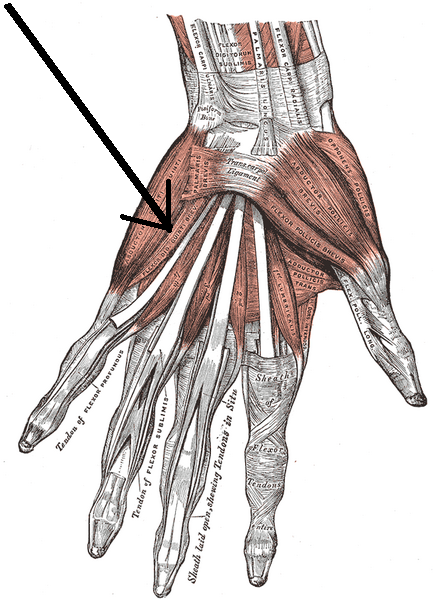
- The muscles of the left hand. Palmar surface

Details
- Origin: Hamate bone
- Insertion: Palmar side of the base of the proximal phalanx of fifth digit
- Artery: Ulnar artery
- Nerve: Deep branch of ulnar nerve
- Actions: Flexes little finger
- Antagonist: Extensor digiti minimi muscle

Identifiers
- Latin: musculus flexor digiti minimi brevis manus
- TA98: A04.6.02.063
- TA2: 2530
- FMA: 37383

The flexor digiti minimi brevis is a hypothenar muscle in the hand that flexes the little finger (digit V) at the metacarpophalangeal joint. It lies lateral to the abductor digiti minimi when the hand is in anatomical position.

== Structure ==
The flexor digiti minimi brevis arises from the hook of the hamate bone and the palmar surface of the flexor retinaculum of the hand. It is inserted into the medial side of the base of the proximal phalanx of digit V. It is separated from the abductor digiti minimi, at its origin, by the deep branches of the ulnar artery and the ulnar nerve. The flexor digiti minimi brevis is sometimes not present; in these cases, the abductor digiti minimi is usually larger than normal.

The flexor digiti minimi brevis is one of three muscles in the hypothenar muscle group. These three muscles form the fleshy mass at the base of the little finger, and are solely concerned with the movement of digit V. The other two muscles that make up the hypothenar muscle group are the abductor digiti minimi and the opponens digiti minimi. In anatomical position from medial to lateral is the abductor digiti minimi, flexor digiti minimi brevis, and opponens digiti minimi.

== Innervation ==
The flexor digiti minimi brevis, like other hypothenar muscles, is innervated by the deep branch of the ulnar nerve. The ulnar nerve arises from the spinal nerve levels C8-T1. The spinal roots of C8 and T1 then merge to form the lower trunk, anterior division, medial cord, and finally produce the ulnar nerve. The ulnar nerve has a superficial and deep branch, but it is the deep branch that innervates the flexor digiti minimi brevis.

== Blood Supply ==
The hypothenar muscles are supplied primarily from the superficial palmar arch of the ulnar artery.

== Actions ==
The flexor digiti minimi brevis flexes the little finger at the metacarpophalangeal joint.

== Etymology ==
The name of this muscle is Latin for the 'short flexor of the little finger'. Note that brevis is usually included to differentiate it from a longus muscle of the same name. The flexor digiti minimi longus, however, is not found in the typical human, but instead is a rare anatomical variation.

== Additional images ==
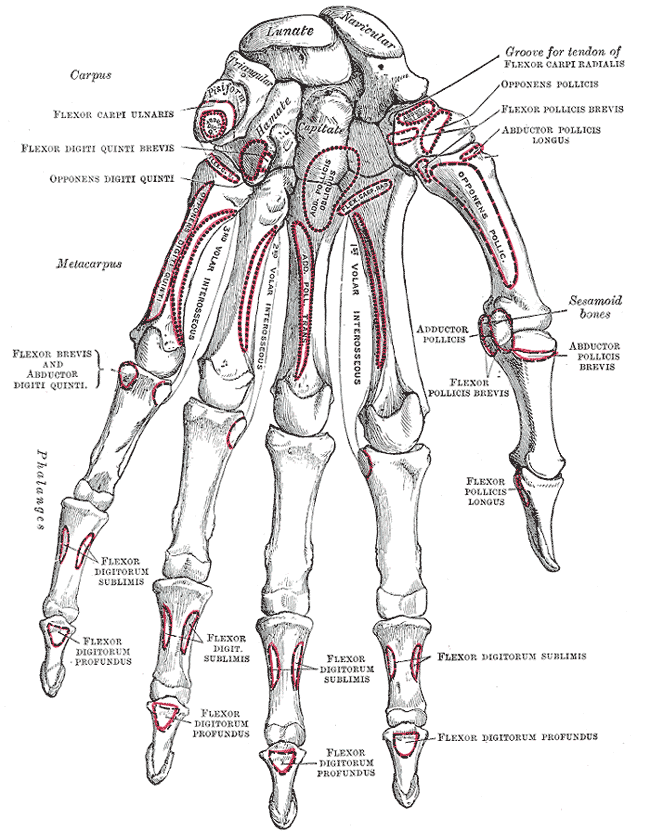
Bones of the left hand. Volar surface.

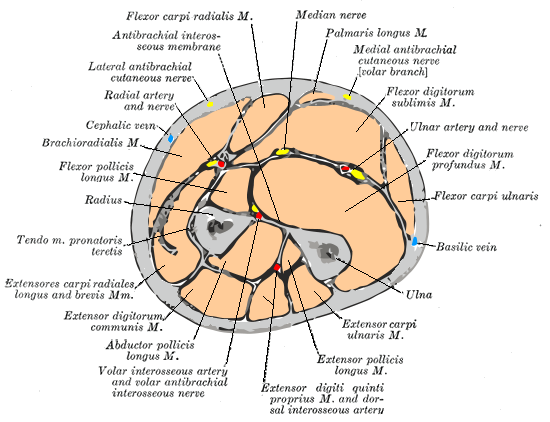
Cross-section through the middle of the forearm.

Transverse section across the wrist and digits.

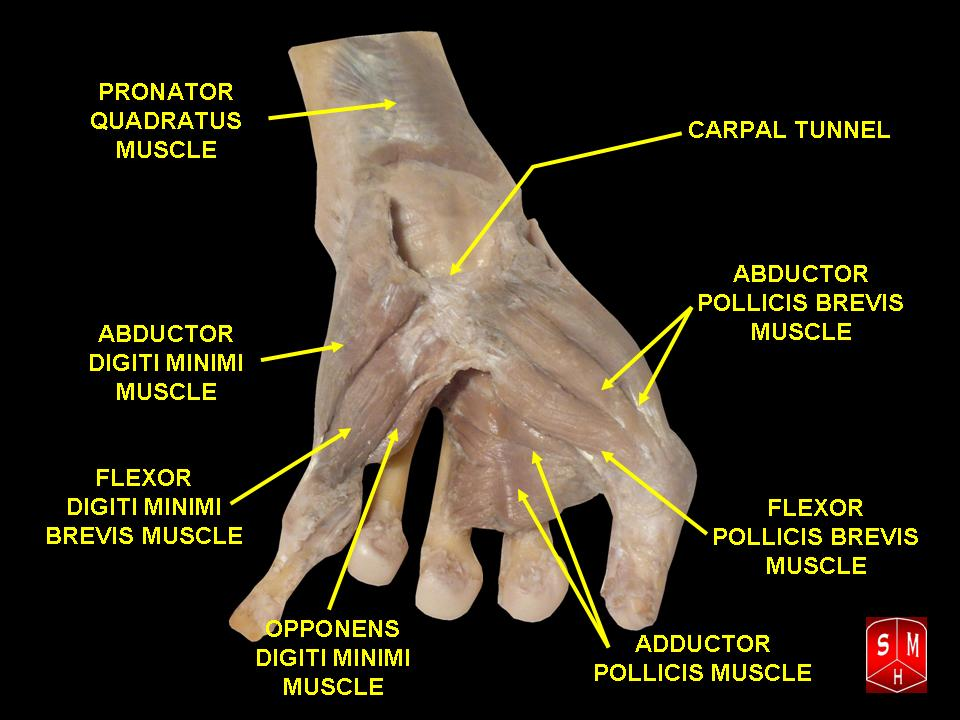
Flexor digiti minimi brevis

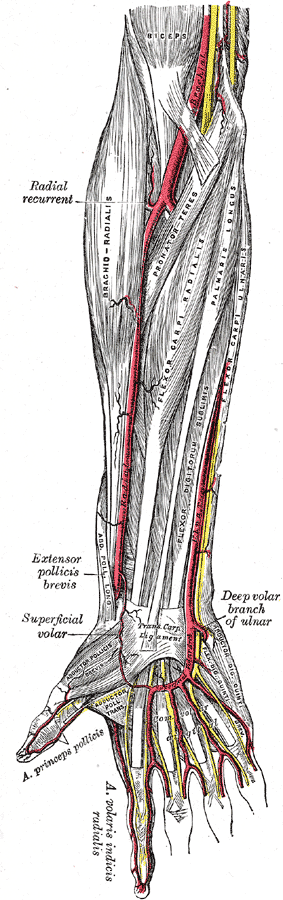
The radial and ulnar arteries.

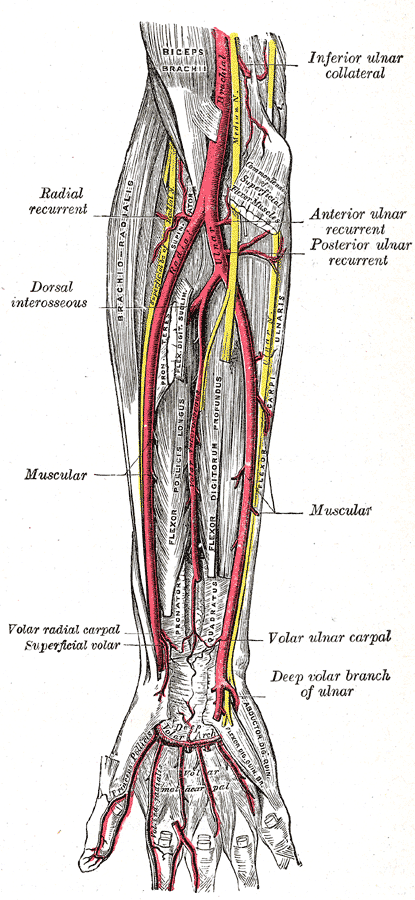
Ulnar and radial arteries. Deep view.

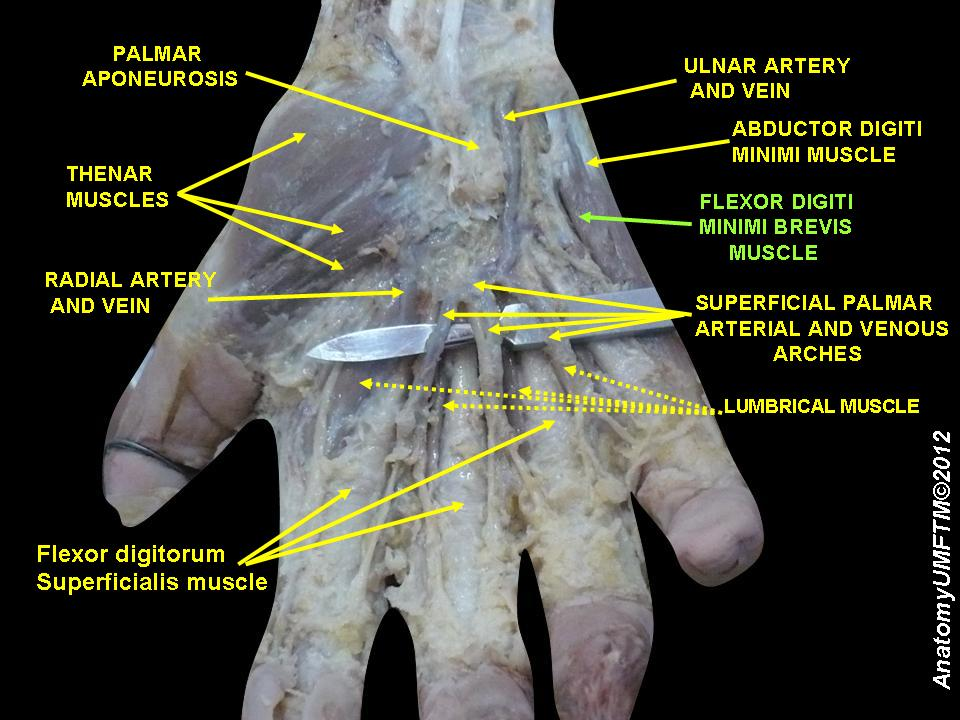
Flexor digiti minimi brevis muscle

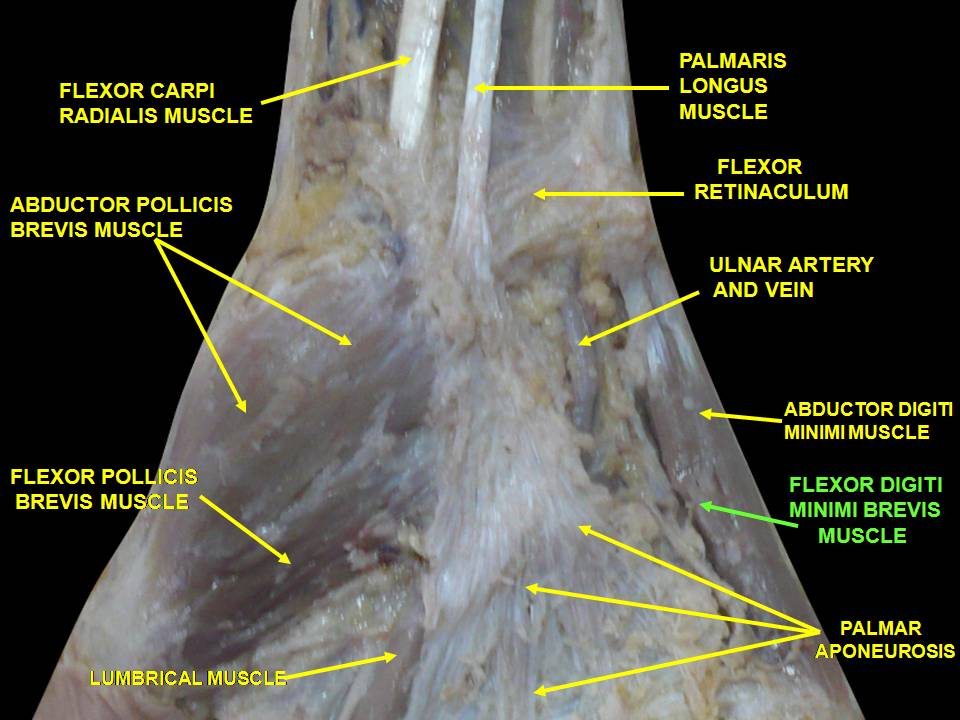
Flexor digiti minimi brevis muscle

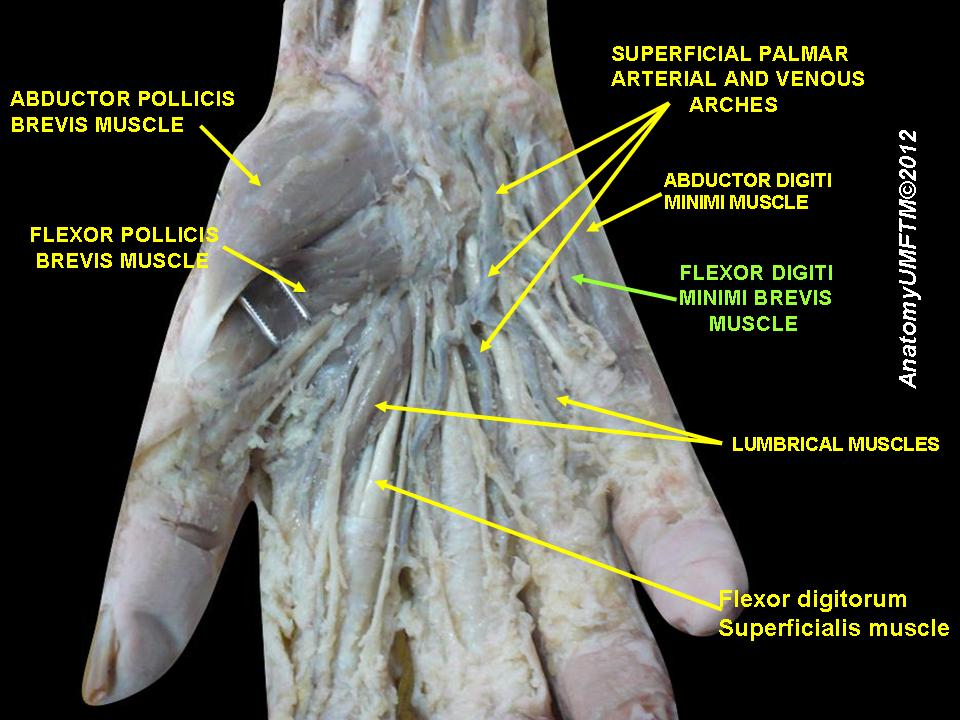
Flexor digiti minimi brevis muscle

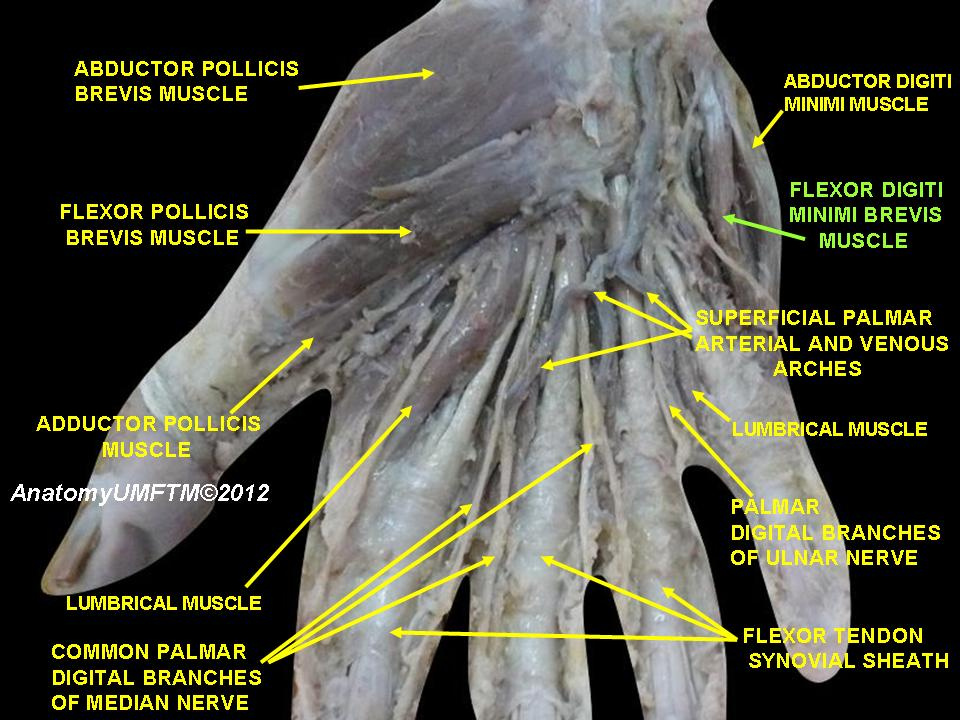
Flexor digiti minimi brevis muscle

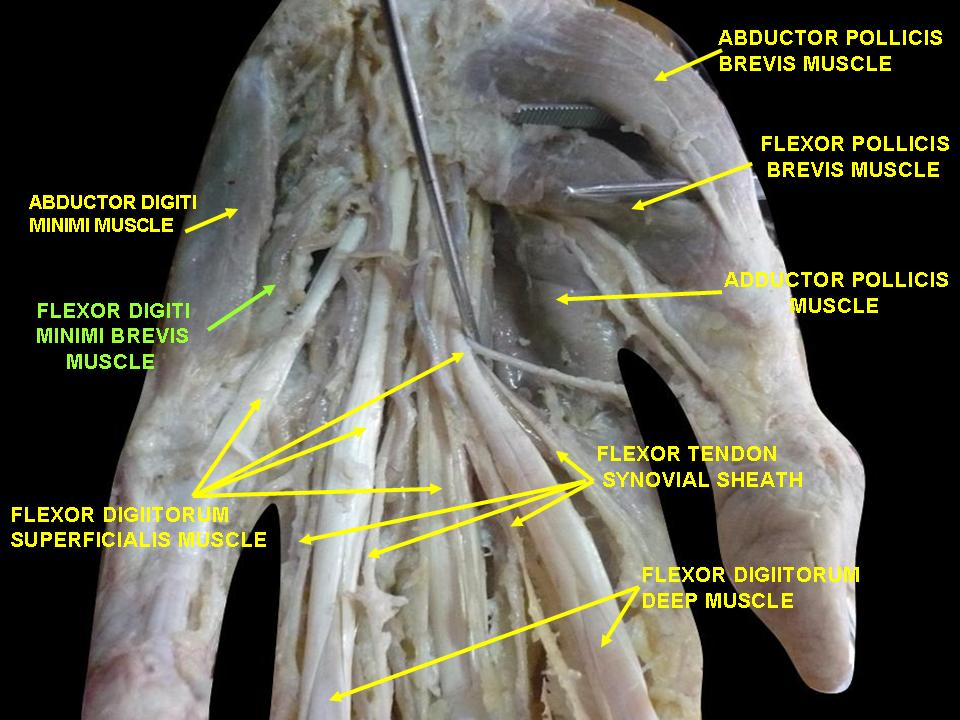
Flexor digiti minimi brevis muscle

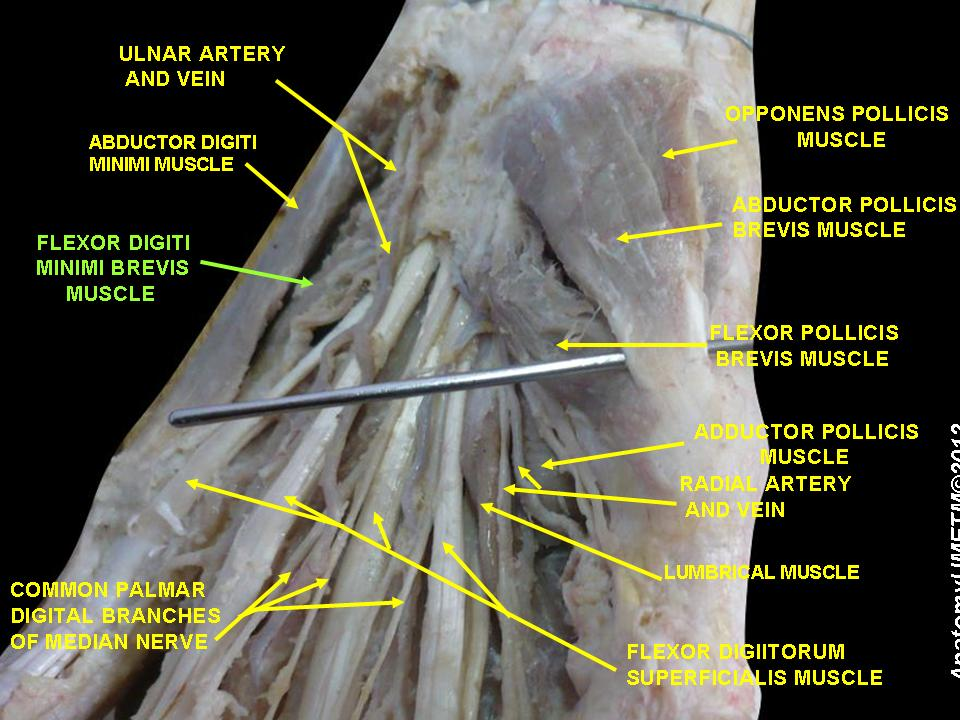
Flexor digiti minimi brevis muscle

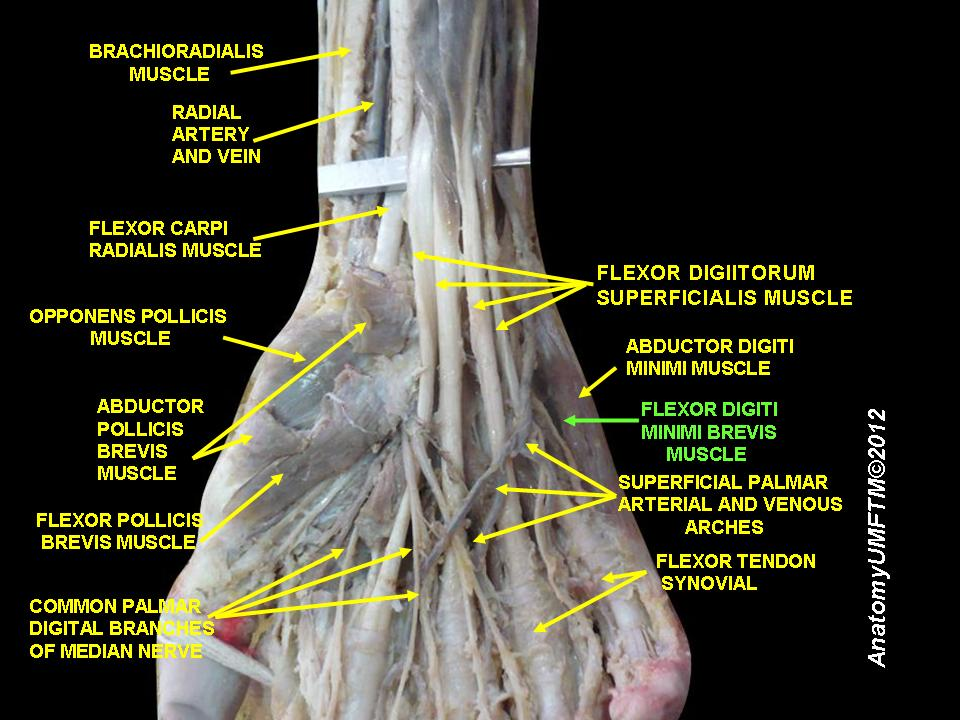
Flexor digiti minimi brevis muscle

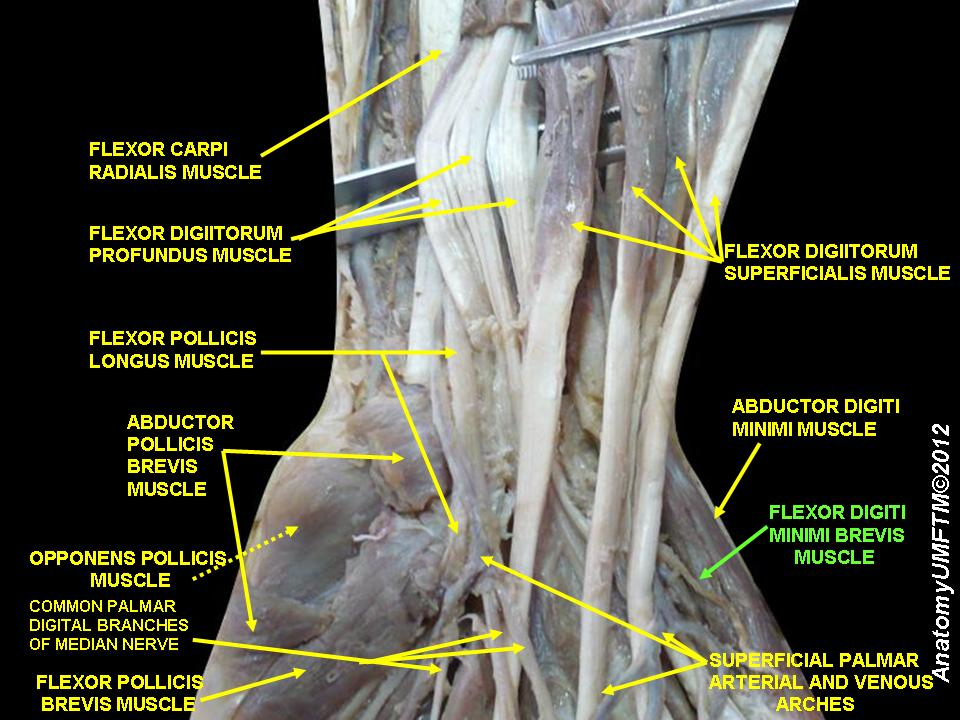
Flexor digiti minimi brevis muscle

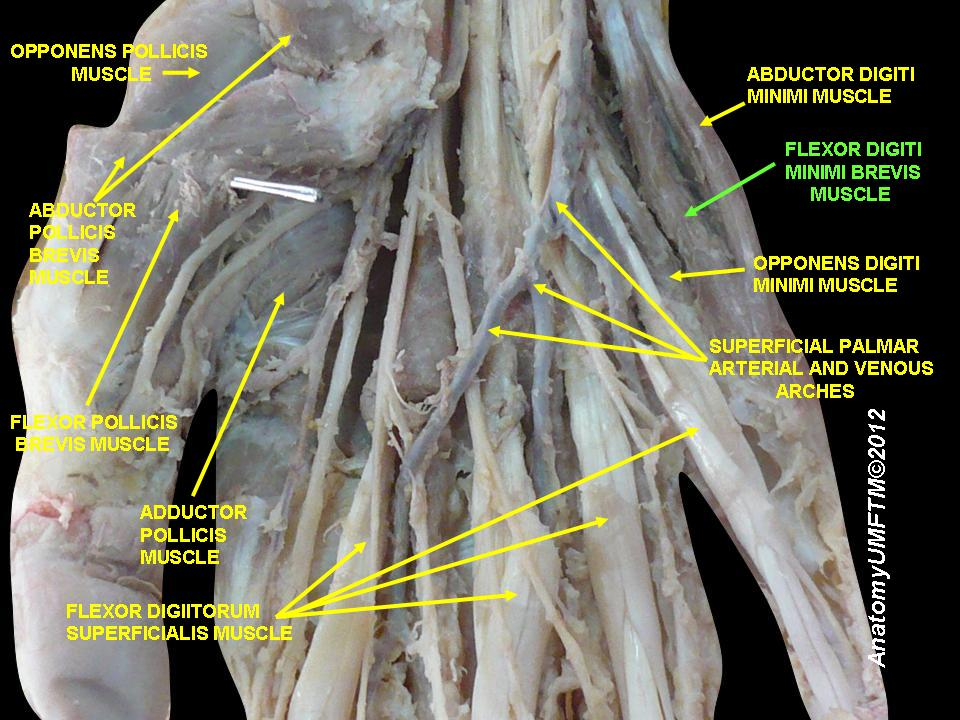
Flexor digiti minimi brevis muscle

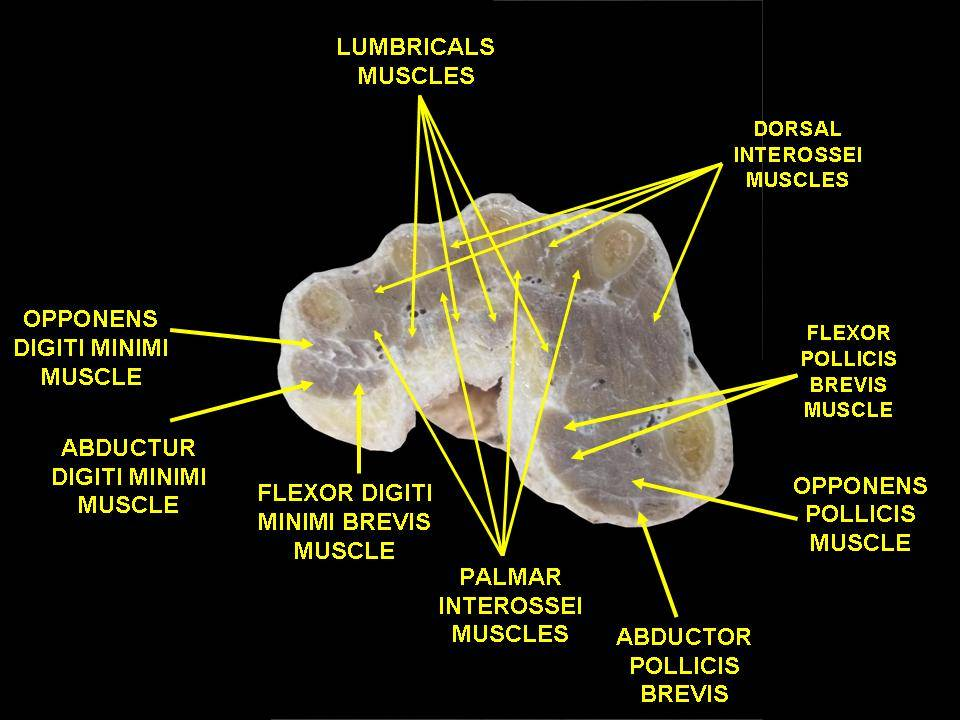
Muscles of hand. Cross section.
