= Minime =

Minime or Minimes may refer to:

- Mini-Me, character in the Austin Powers films
- MiniMe, PCLinuxOS minimal installation
- Les Minimes, marina at La Rochelle, France
- Lac des Minimes, small lake in Paris, France
- Stade des Minimes, rugby league stadium in Toulouse, France

== See also ==
- Minim (disambiguation)
- Minimi (disambiguation)
