= Opponens =

Opponens may refer to:

- Opponens digiti minimi muscle
- Opponens pollicis muscle
