= Palmar branch of ulnar nerve =

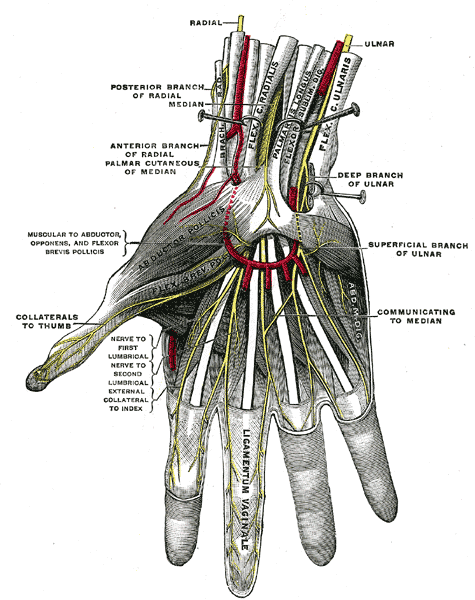
- Superficial palmar nerves. (Deep branch of ulnar and superficial branch of ulnar labeled at center right.)

- Diagram of segmental distribution of the cutaneous nerves of the right upper extremity. (Ulnar palmar labeled at bottom left, in blue.)

Details
- From: Ulnar nerve
- To: Superficial branch, deep branch

Identifiers
- Latin: ramus palmaris nervi ulnaris
- TA98: A14.2.03.044
- TA2: 6453
- FMA: 44878

The palmar branch of the ulnar nerve arises about five cm proximal to the wrist from where the ulnar nerve splits into palmar and dorsal branches. It supplies sensory innervation to a small area on the palmar surface of the wrist.

The palmar branch represents the continuation of the ulnar nerve as it crosses the flexor retinaculum of the hand on the lateral side of the pisiform bone, medial to and a little behind the ulnar artery.

Some sources state that it ends by dividing into a superficial and a deep branch. (Other sources state that the superficial branch of ulnar nerve and deep branch of ulnar nerve are the terminal branches of the ulnar nerve itself.)

== Additional images ==
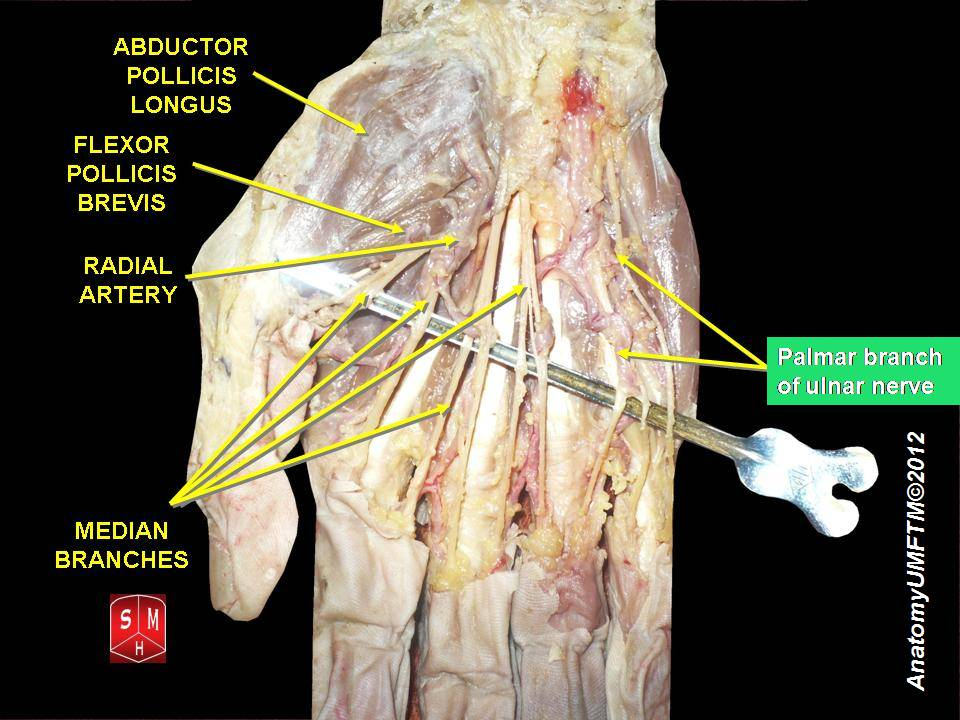
Palmar branch of ulnar nerve

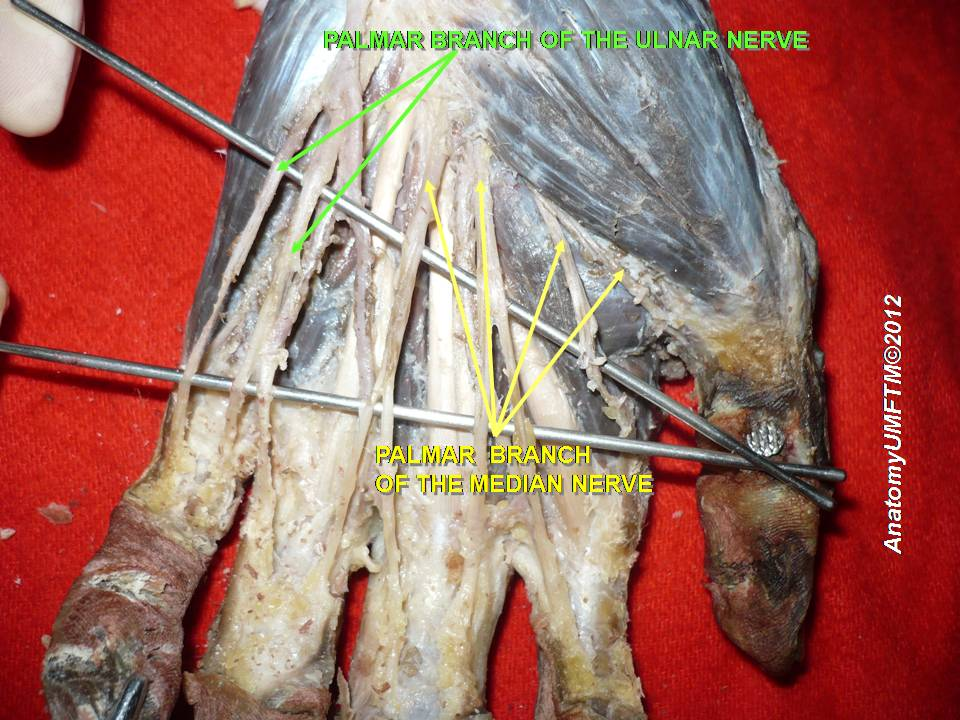
Palmar branch of ulnar nerve
