= Ulnar nerve =

Nerve which runs near the ulna bone

- Click image to enlarge - ulnar nerve is visible in lower left

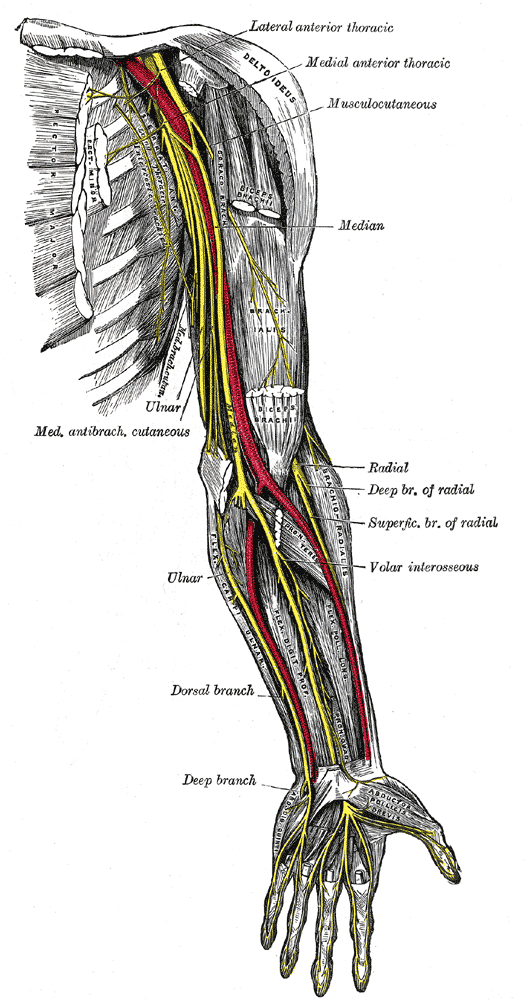
- Nerves of the left upper extremity. (Ulnar labeled at center left.)

Details
- From: C8, T1 (branch from medial cord)
- Innervates: Flexor carpi ulnaris flexor digitorum profundus lumbrical muscles opponens digiti minimi flexor digiti minimi abductor digiti minimi interossei adductor pollicis

Identifiers
- Latin: nervus ulnaris
- MeSH: D014459
- TA98: A14.2.03.040
- TA2: 6449
- FMA: 37319

The ulnar nerve is a nerve that runs near the ulna, one of the two long bones in the forearm. The ulnar collateral ligament of elbow joint is in relation with the ulnar nerve. The nerve is the largest in the human body unprotected by muscle or bone, so injury is common. This nerve is directly connected to the little finger, and the adjacent half of the ring finger, innervating the palmar aspect of these fingers, including both front and back of the tips, perhaps as far back as the fingernail beds.

This nerve can cause an electric shock-like sensation by striking the medial epicondyle of the humerus posteriorly, or inferiorly with the elbow flexed. The ulnar nerve is trapped between the bone and the overlying skin at this point. This is commonly referred to as bumping one's "funny bone". This name is thought to be a pun, based on the sound resemblance between the name of the bone of the upper arm, the humerus, and the word "humorous". Alternatively, according to the Oxford English Dictionary, it may refer to "the peculiar sensation experienced when it is struck".

== Structure ==
=== Arm ===
The ulnar nerve originates from the C8-T1 nerve roots (and occasionally carries C7 fibers which arise from the lateral cord), which then form part of the medial cord of the brachial plexus, and descends medial to the brachial artery, up until the insertion point of coracobrachialis muscle (middle 5 cm over the medial border of the humerus). Then, it pierces the medial intermuscular septum and enters the posterior compartment of the arm, accompanied by superior ulnar collateral vessels. It runs at the posteromedial aspects of the humerus, passing behind the medial epicondyle (in the cubital tunnel) at the elbow, where it can be palpated.

=== Forearm ===
It enters the anterior (flexor) compartment of the forearm between the two heads of flexor carpi ulnaris, and lies along the lateral border of the flexor carpi ulnaris. The ulnar nerve runs between the flexor digitorum superficialis (laterally) and flexor digitorum profundus medially. Near the wrist, it courses superficial to the flexor retinaculum of hand, but covered by volar carpal ligament to enter the hand.

In the forearm it gives off the following branches:

- Muscular branches of ulnar nerve – supplies one and a half muscles (flexor carpi ulnaris and the medial half of flexor digitorum profundus)
- Palmar branch of ulnar nerve – arises from the middle part of the forearm and supplies the skin over the hypothenar eminence.
- Dorsal branch of ulnar nerve – arises from 7.5 cm above the wrist, winds backwards to supply the skin of the proximal part of the ulnar one and half fingers and the adjoining area between the fingers.
- Articular branches are given off to the elbow joint.

=== Hand ===
Branches of the ulnar nerve in hand

Ulnar nerve enters the palm of the hand via the Guyon's canal, superficial to the flexor retinaculum and lateral to the pisiform bone.

Here it gives off the following branches:

- Superficial branch of ulnar nerve – supplies the palmaris brevis and gives digital branches to the medial one and a half fingers.
- Deep branch of ulnar nerve – It accompanies the deep branch of the ulnar artery. It passes backwards between the abductor digiti minimi, flexor digiti minimi, and opponens digiti minimi, supplying all the three muscles, and lying on the hook of hamate bone. It then turns laterally, supplying the 3rd and 4th lumbricals and all the palmar interossei muscles and dorsal interossei of the hand. It terminates by supplying the adductor pollicis.
- Articular branches to the wrist.

== Function ==
The ulnar nerve is also known as the "musician's nerve" as it controls the fine movements of the fingers.

=== Sensory ===
Cutaneous innervation of the right upper extremity. Areas innervated by the ulnar nerve are the areas on the hand colored in light blue.

The ulnar nerve also provides sensory innervation to the fifth digit and the medial half of the fourth digit, and the corresponding part of the palm:

- Palmar branch of ulnar nerve – supplies cutaneous innervation to the anterior skin and nails
- Dorsal branch of ulnar nerve – supplies cutaneous innervation to the dorsal medial hand and the dorsum of the medial 1.5 fingers

=== Motor ===
Ulnar nerve and its branches innervate the following muscles in the forearm and hand:

- An articular branch that passes to the elbow joint while the ulnar nerve is passing between the olecranon and medial epicondyle of the humerus
- In the forearm, via the muscular branches of ulnar nerve:
  - Flexor carpi ulnaris
  - Flexor digitorum profundus (medial half)
- In the hand, via the deep branch of ulnar nerve:
  - Hypothenar muscles
    - Opponens digiti minimi
    - Abductor digiti minimi
    - Flexor digiti minimi brevis
  - The third and fourth lumbrical muscles
  - Dorsal interossei
  - Palmar interossei
  - Adductor pollicis
  - Flexor pollicis brevis (deep head)
- In the hand, via the superficial branch of ulnar nerve:
  - Palmaris brevis

== Clinical significance ==
The ulnar nerve can suffer injury anywhere between its proximal origin of the brachial plexus all the way to its distal branches in the hand. It is the most commonly injured nerve around the elbow. Although it can be damaged under various circumstances, it is commonly injured by local trauma or physical impingement ("pinched nerve"). Injury of the ulnar nerve at different levels causes specific motor and sensory deficits.

=== At the elbow ===
- Common mechanisms of injury: Cubital tunnel syndrome, fracture of the medial epicondyle of the humerus (causing direct ulnar nerve injury), fracture of the lateral epicondyle of the humerus (causing cubitus valgus with tardy ulnar nerve palsy), Driver's Elbow
- Motor deficit:
  - Weakness in flexion of the hand at the wrist, loss of flexion of ulnar half of digits, or the 4th and 5th digits, loss of ability to cross the digits of the hand. (Note: Motor deficit is absent or very minor in cubital tunnel syndrome as the ulnar nerve is compressed in the cubital tunnel, rather than transected.)
  - Presence of a claw hand deformity when the hand is at rest, due to hyperextension of the 4th and 5th digits at the metacarpophalangeal joints, and flexion at the interphalangeal joints.
  - Weakness of adduction of the thumb, which may be assessed by the presence of Froment's sign.
- Sensory deficit: Loss of sensation or paresthesiae in ulnar half of the palm and dorsum of hand, and the medial 1½ digits on both palmar and dorsal aspects of the hand

=== At the wrist ===
- Common mechanism: penetrating wounds, Guyon canal cyst (and other lesions)
- Motor deficit:
  - Loss of flexion of ulnar half of digits, or the 4th and 5th digits, loss of ability to cross the digits of the hand.
  - Presence of a claw hand deformity when the hand is at rest, due to hyperextension of the 4th and 5th digits at the metacarpophalangeal joints, and flexion at the interphalangeal joints.
  - The claw hand deformity is more prominent with injury at the wrist as opposed to a lesion higher up in the arm, for instance, at the elbow, as the ulnar half of the flexor digitorum profundus is not affected. This pulls the distal interphalangeal joints of the 4th and 5th digit into a more flexed position, producing a more deformed 'claw'. This is known as the ulnar paradox.
  - Weakness of adduction of the thumb, which may be assessed by the presence of Froment's sign.
- Sensory deficit: Loss of sensation or paresthesiae in ulnar half of the palm, and the medial 1½ digits on the palmar aspect of the hand, with dorsal sparing. The dorsal aspect of the hand is unaffected as the posterior cutaneous branch of the ulnar nerve is given off higher up in the forearm and does not reach the wrist.

In severe cases, surgery may be performed to relocate or "release" the nerve to prevent further injury.

== Additional images ==
Brachial plexus with courses of spinal nerves shown

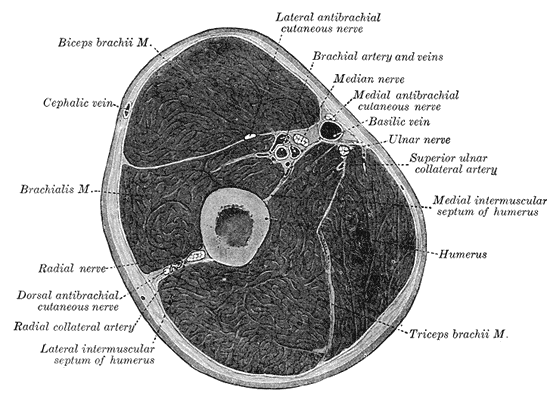
Cross-section through the middle of upper arm

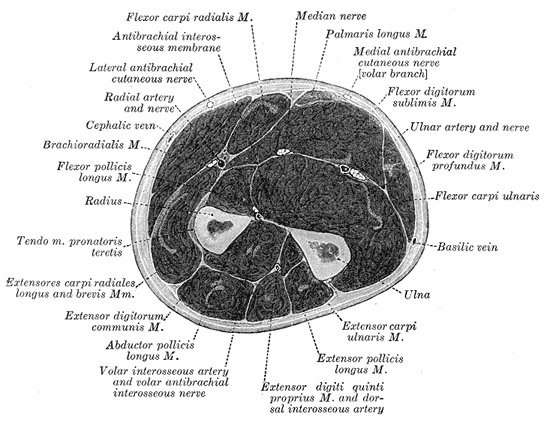
Cross-section through the middle of the forearm

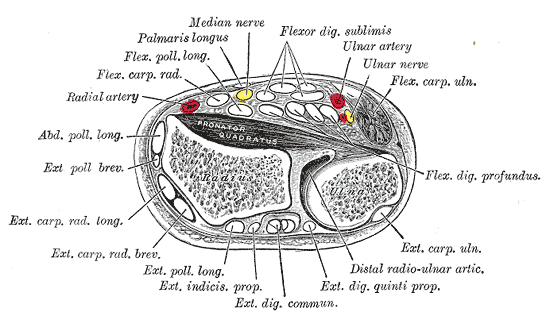
Transverse section across distal ends of radius and ulna

Transverse section across the wrist and digits

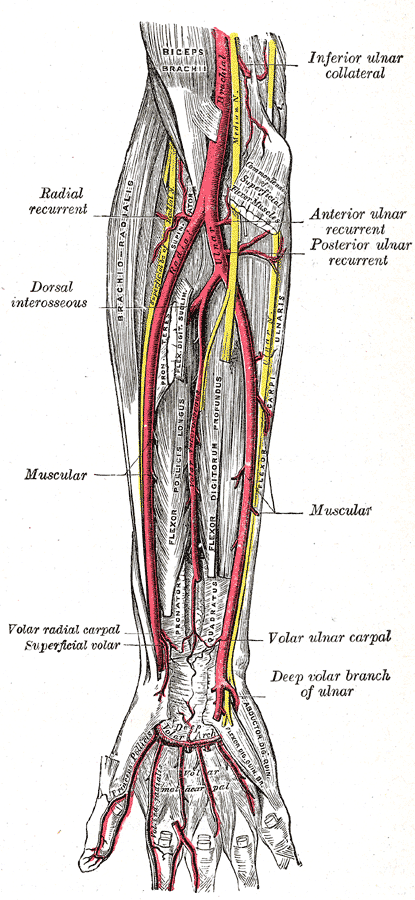
Ulnar and radial arteries. Deep view.

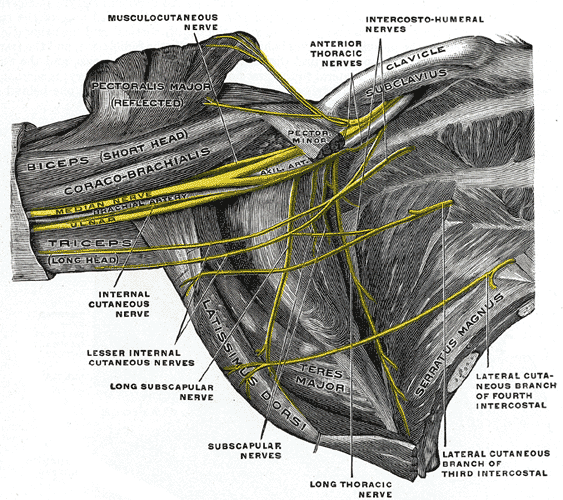
The right brachial plexus (infraclavicular portion) in the axillary fossa; viewed from below and in front

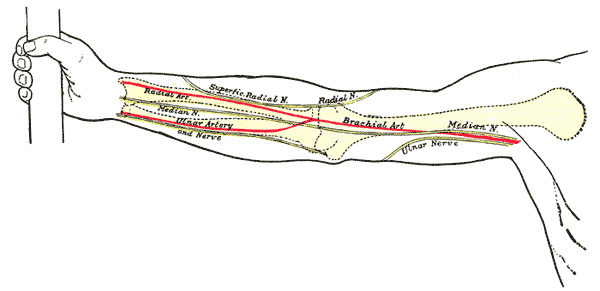
Front of right upper extremity, showing surface markings for bones, arteries, and nerves

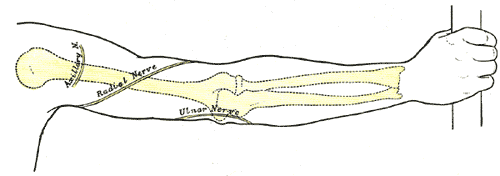
Back of right upper extremity, showing surface markings for bones and nerves

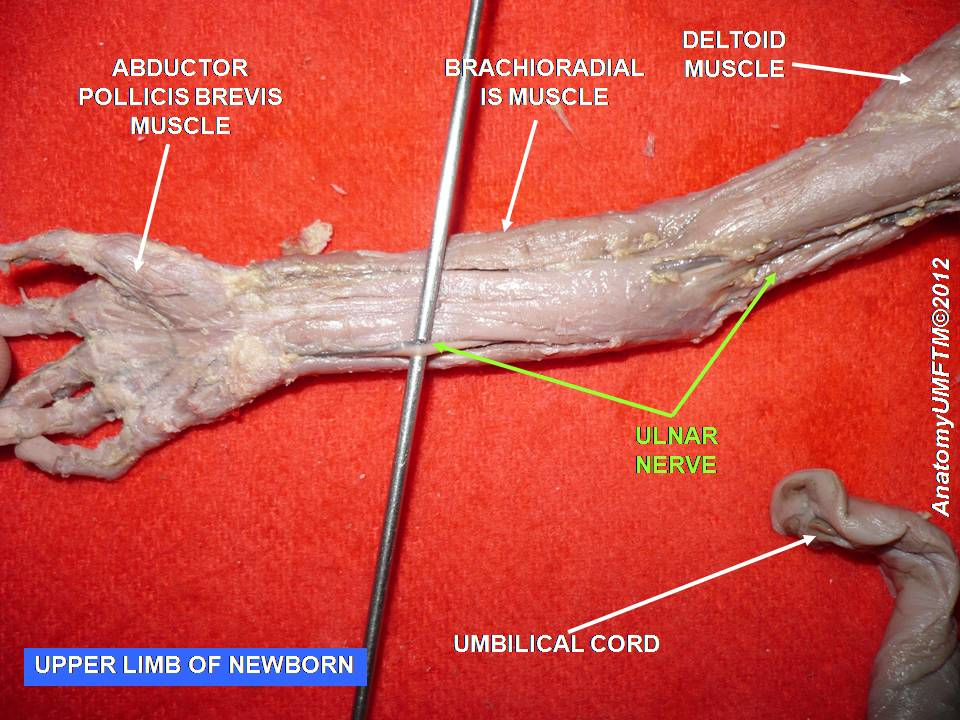
Ulnar nerve

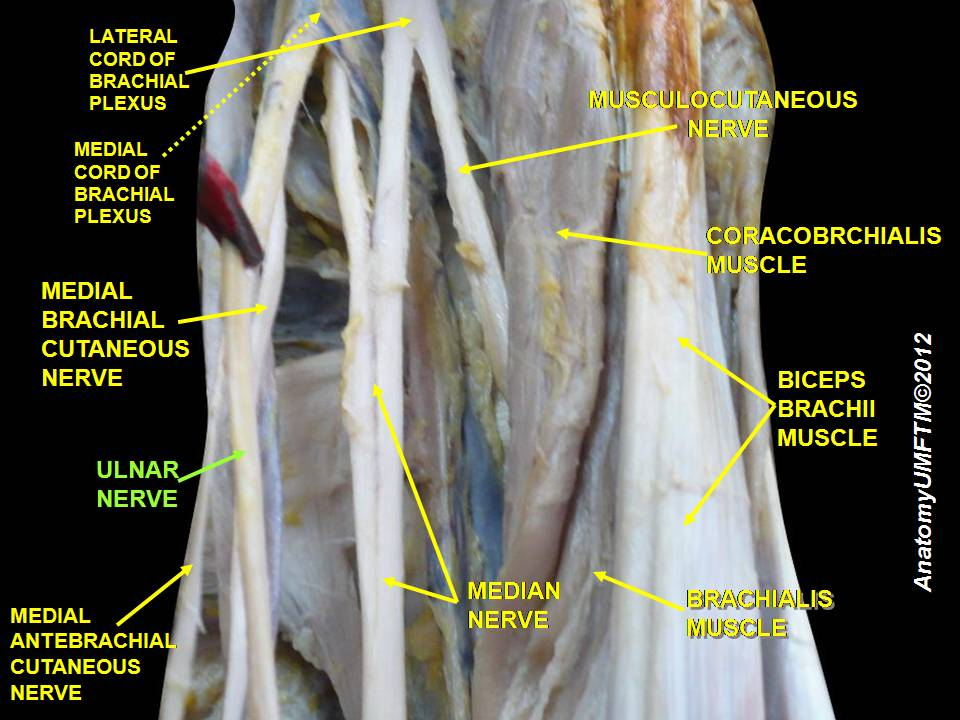
Brachial plexus with characteristic M, ulnar nerve labeled

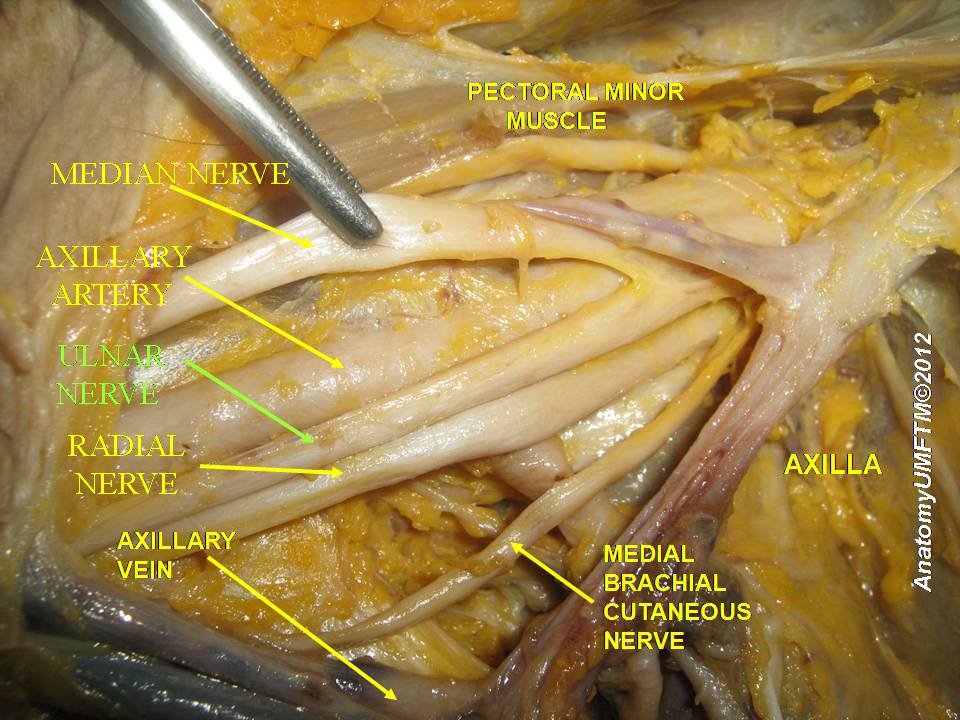
Ulnar nerve

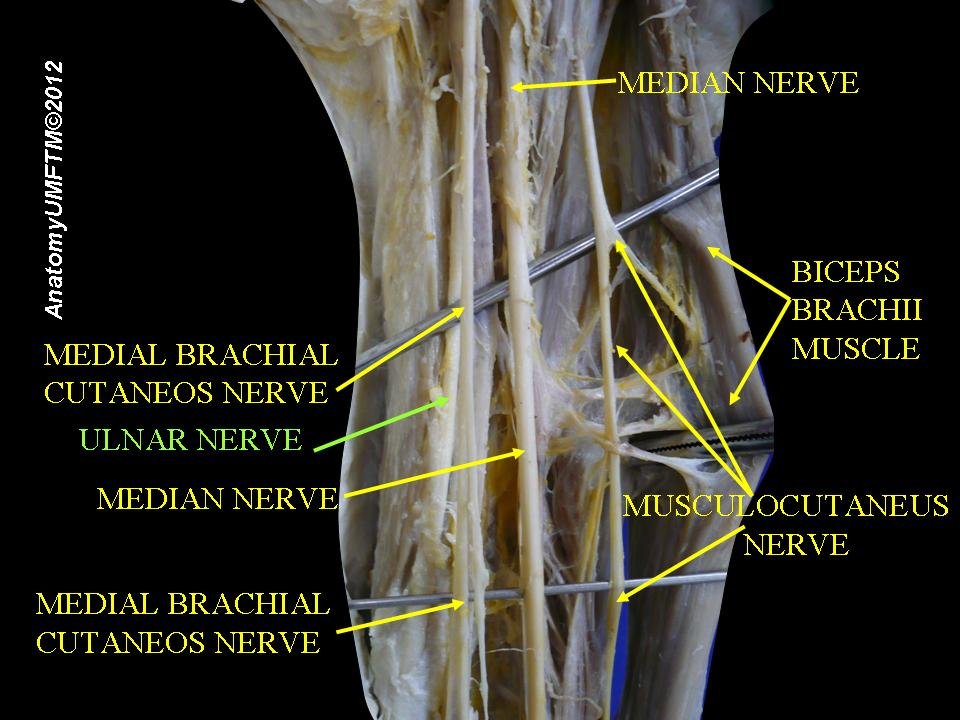
Ulnar nerve

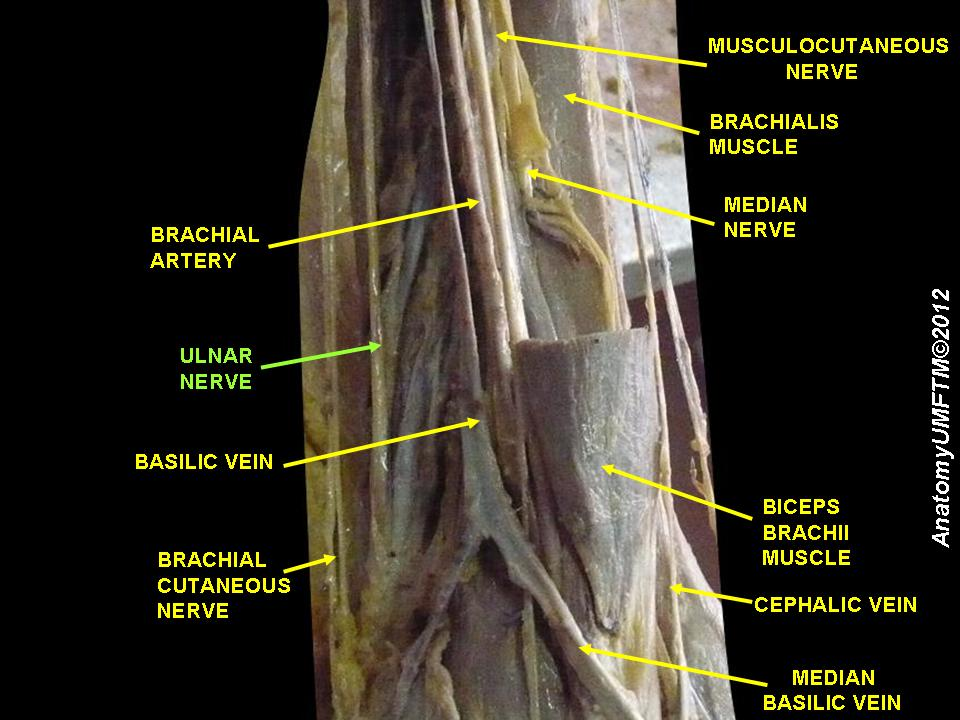
Ulnar nerve

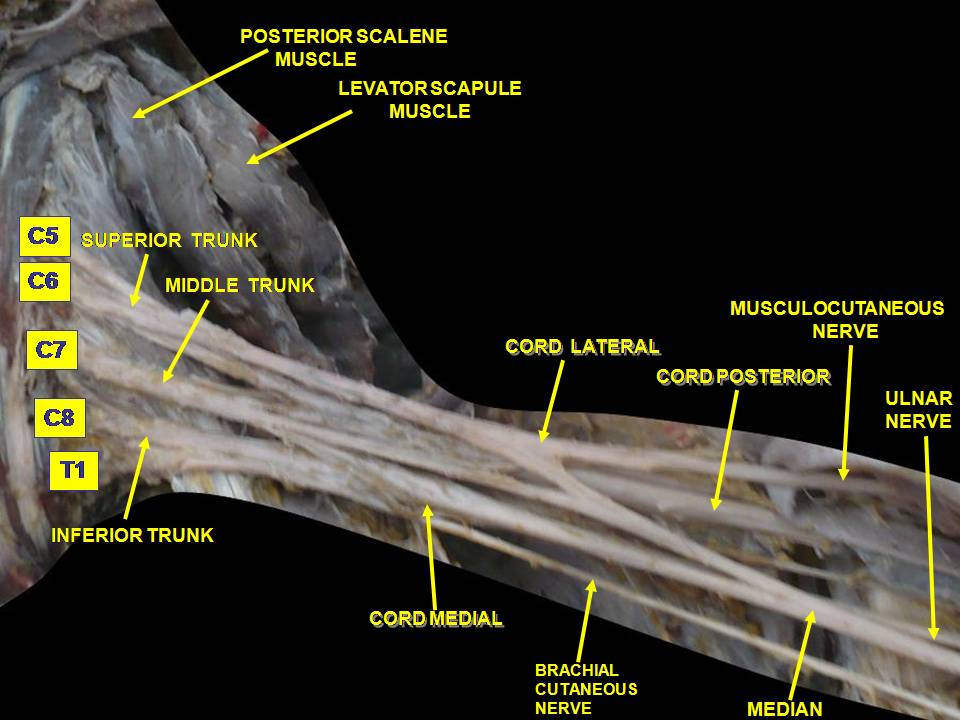
Brachial plexus. Deep dissection. Anterolateral view

== See also ==
- Axillary nerve
- Median nerve
- Musculocutaneous nerve
- Radial nerve
- Brachial plexus
- Medial cord
- Palmar cutaneous branch of the ulnar nerve
- Dorsal branch of the ulnar nerve
- Deep branch of the ulnar nerve
- Superficial branch of ulnar nerve
- Muscular branches of the ulnar nerve
- Cubital tunnel
- Guyon canal
- Struthers' ligament
- Cubital tunnel syndrome
- Ulnar nerve entrapment
- Nerve compression syndrome
