= Opponens digiti minimi muscle of hand =

Muscle in the hypothenar compartment

Opponens digiti minimi muscle
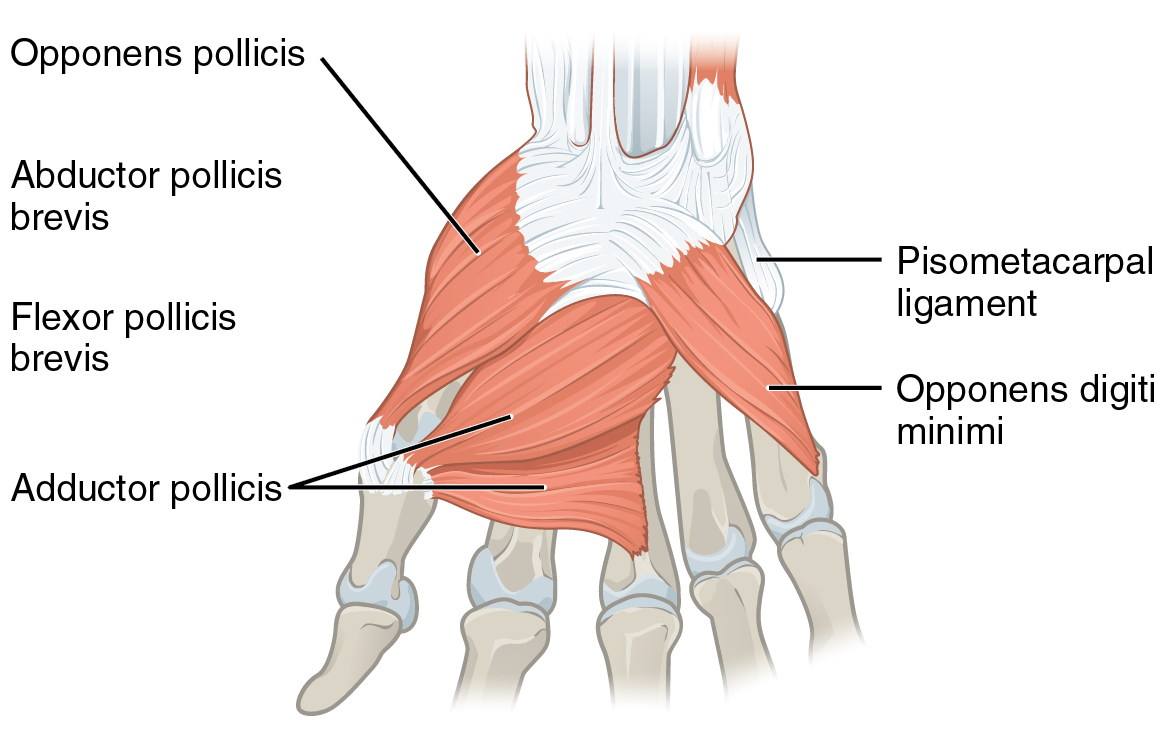
- Deep muscles of the right hand, palmar view.

Details
- Origin: Hook of hamate and flexor retinaculum
- Insertion: Medial border of 5th metacarpal (in hand, 3rd digit is orientation of mid-line)
- Artery: Ulnar artery
- Nerve: Deep branch of ulnar nerve (C8 and T1)
- Actions: Draws 5th metacarpal anteriorly and rotates it, bringing little finger (5th digit) into opposition with thumb

Identifiers
- Latin: musculus opponens digiti minimi (Old: opponens quinti digiti)
- TA98: A04.6.02.064
- TA2: 2531
- FMA: 37384

The opponens digiti minimi (opponens digiti quinti in older texts) is a muscle in the hand. It is of a triangular form, and placed immediately beneath the palmaris brevis, abductor digiti minimi and flexor digiti minimi brevis. It is one of the three hypothenar muscles that control the little finger.

It originates from the convexity of the hook (sin. hamulus) of the hamate bone and the contiguous portion of the transverse carpal ligament; it is inserted into the whole length of the metacarpal bone of the little finger, along its ulnar margin.

The opponens digiti minimi muscle serves to flex and laterally rotate the 5th metacarpal about the 5th carpometacarpal joint, as when bringing the little finger and thumb into opposition. It is innervated by the deep branch of the ulnar nerve.

== See also ==
- Hypothenar
- Opponens pollicis muscle

== Additional images ==
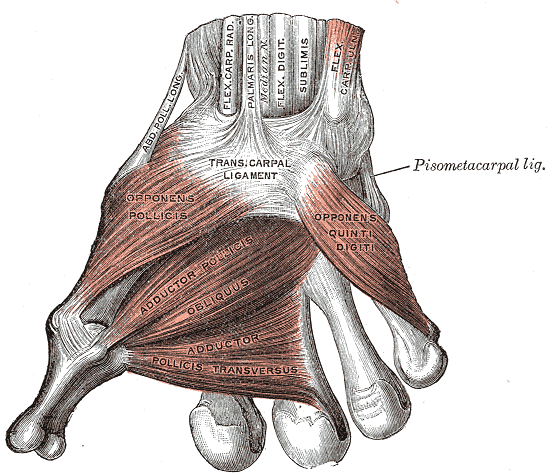
The muscles of the thumb. (Opponens quinti digiti visible at center right.)

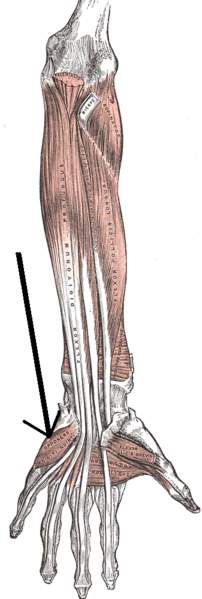
Front of the left forearm. Deep muscles. (Opponens digiti quinti visible at bottom left.)

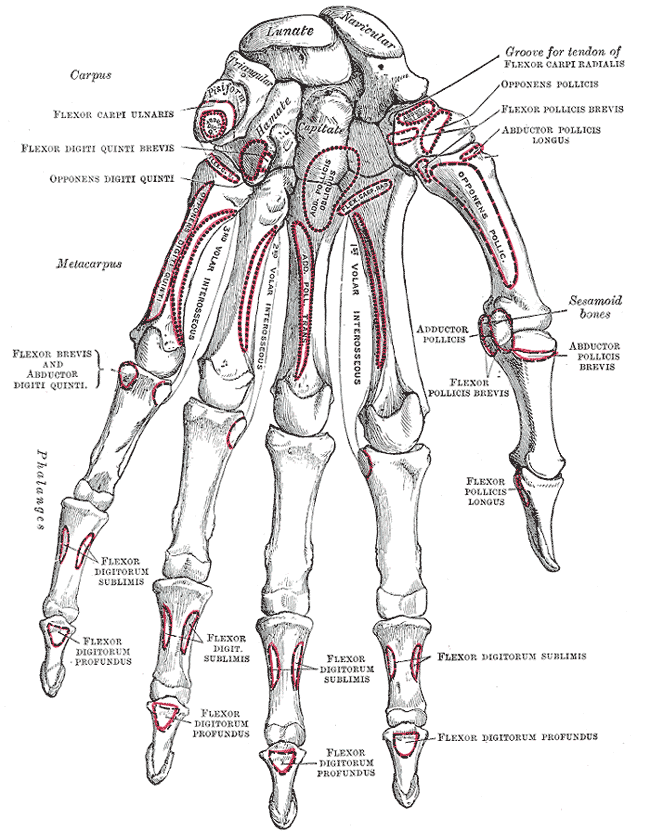
Bones of the left hand. Volar surface.

Transverse section across the wrist and digits.

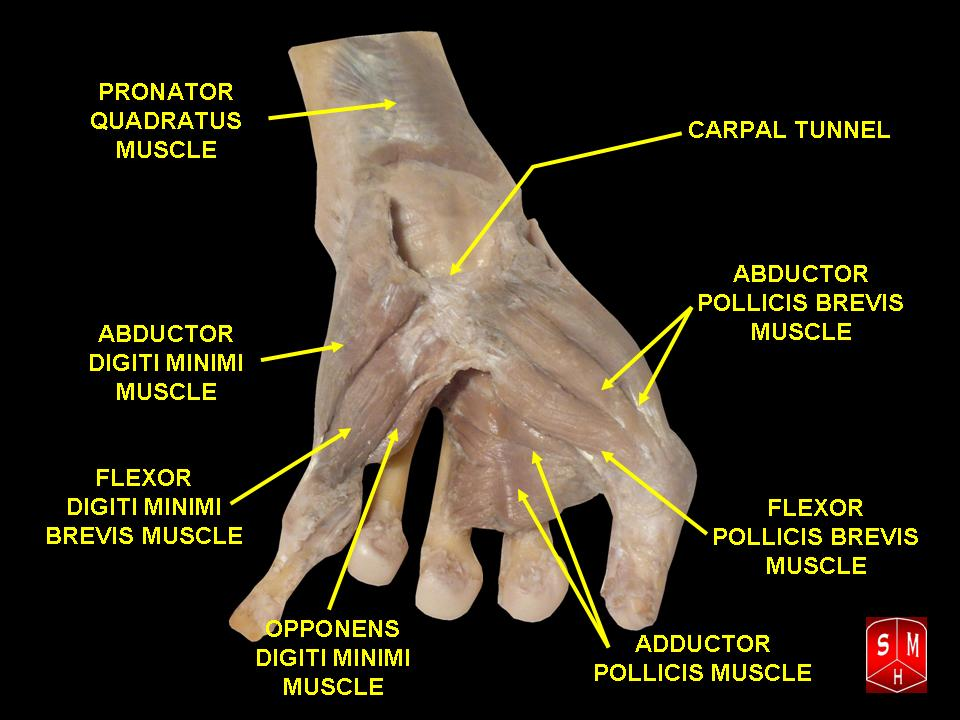
Opponens digiti minimi

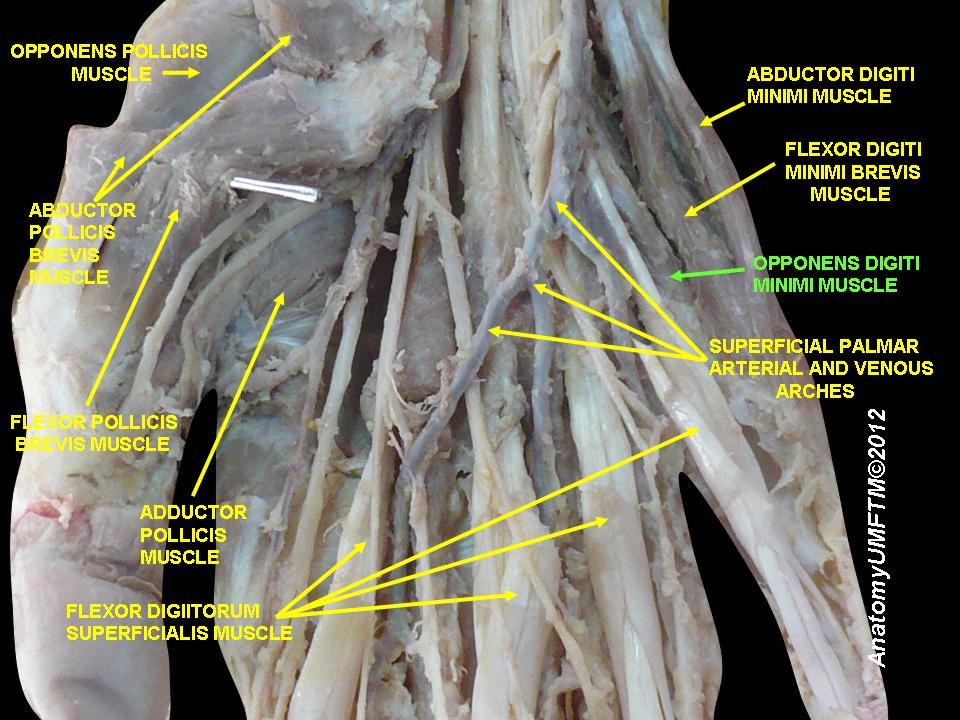
Opponens digiti minimi

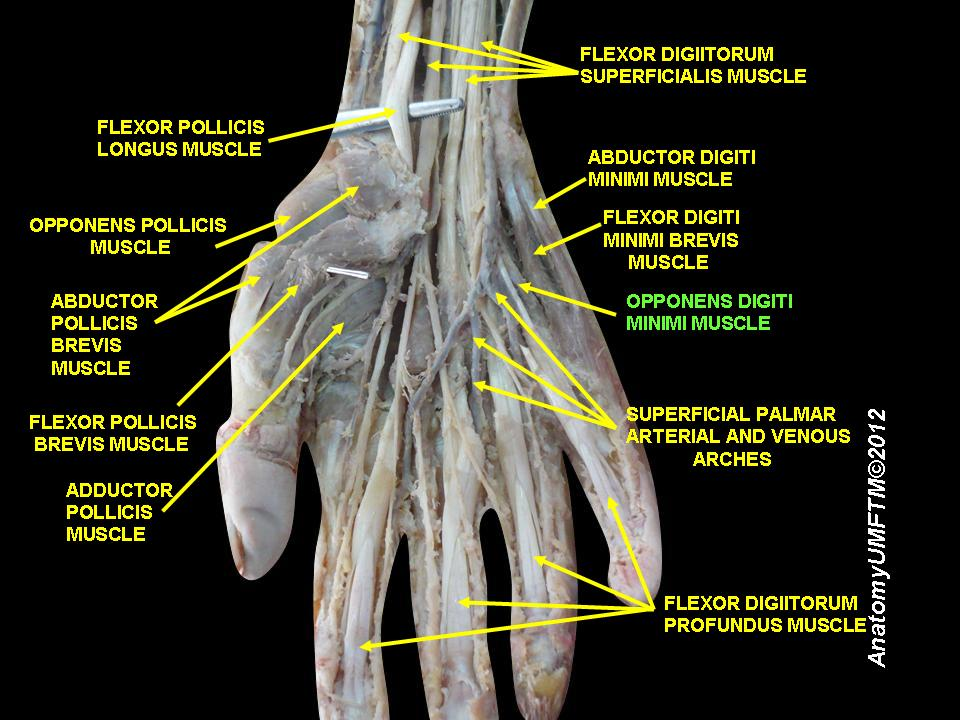
Opponens digiti minimi muscle

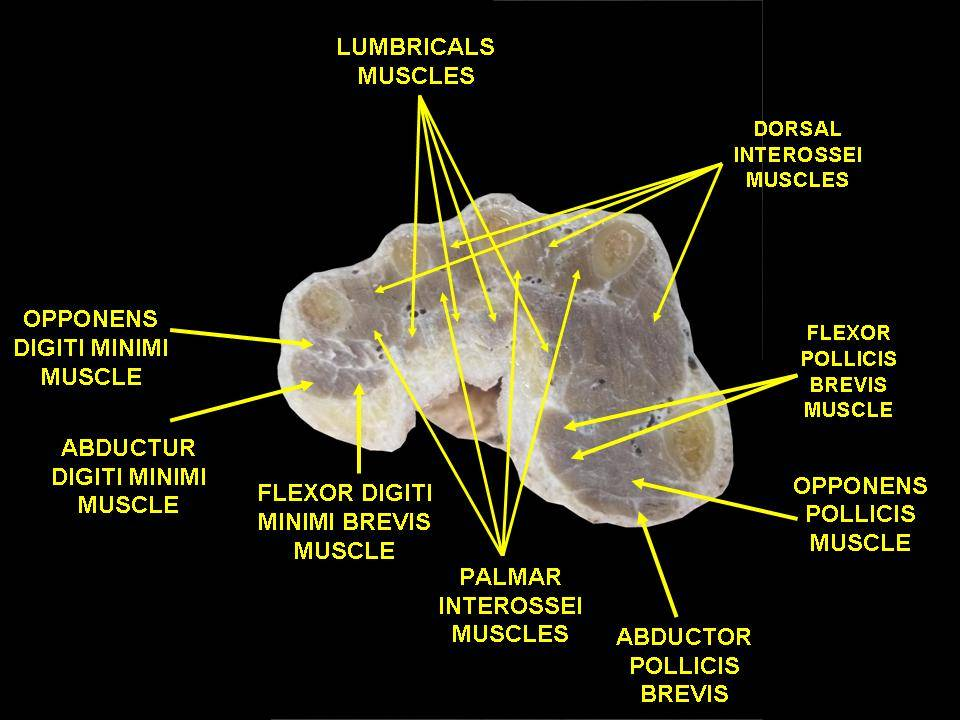
Muscles of hand. Cross section.
