= Minimi =

Minimi can refer to:

- FN Minimi, a belt-fed light machine gun
- Minims (religious order), a religious order known as the Minimi (Minims, Order of the Minims)
- Abductor digiti minimi muscle of hand, a muscle in the hand
- Abductor digiti minimi muscle of foot, a muscle in the foot
- Orazio Minimi, a Roman Catholic bishop

== See also ==
- Minim (disambiguation)
- Minime (disambiguation)
