= Claw hand =

Claw hand can refer to:

- Ectrodactyly
- A symptom of Ulnar nerve entrapment. See Ulnar claw
