= Minim =

Minim may refer to:

- Minim (music), or half note
- MINIM, a Spanish industrial rock band
- Minim (unit), a small amount of fluid, a standardized drop
- Order of Minims, a member of a religious order founded by St. Francis of Paula
  - Franciscan Minims of the Perpetual Help of Mary
- Minim (palaeography), a short vertical stroke used in handwriting
- Minim, a Hebrew word denoting "sectarians" (e.g. Sadducees, Nazoraeans, etc.); see Heresy in Judaism
- Minim Inc., later merged to form Zoom Telephonics, an American networking company
- Minim, Martap, a village in Cameroon
- Mini-M, also known as Inmarsat-M, a global satellite internet, telephony and fax network operated by Inmarsat

== See also ==
- Minimi (disambiguation)
- Minimum
- Minium, an algae genus
- Minium (mineral)
- Minium (pigment)
