= Dorsal branch of ulnar nerve =

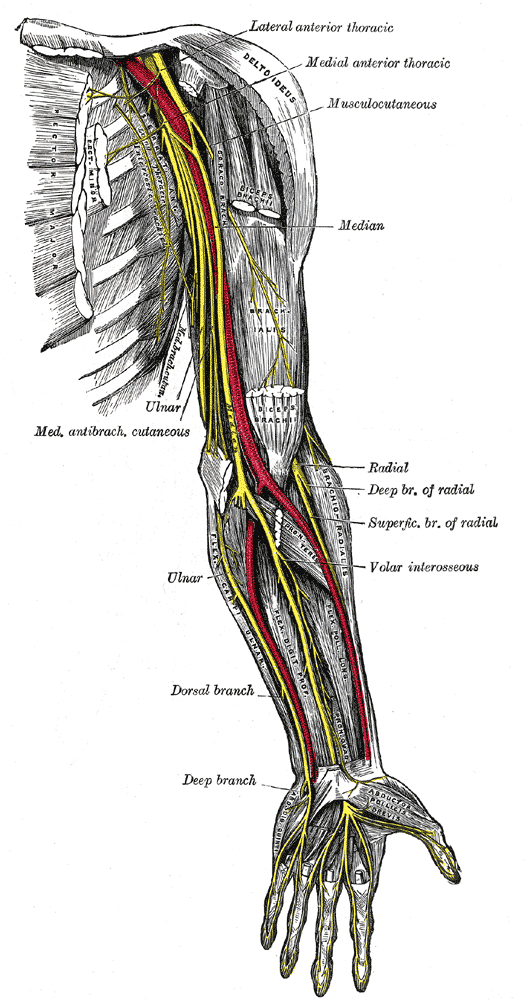
- Nerves of the left upper extremity. (Dorsal branch labeled at bottom left.)

Details
- From: Ulnar nerve

Identifiers
- Latin: ramus dorsalis nervi ulnaris
- TA98: A14.2.03.042
- TA2: 6451
- FMA: 44875

The dorsal branch of ulnar nerve arises about 5 cm. proximal to the wrist; it passes backward beneath the Flexor carpi ulnaris, perforates the deep fascia, and, running along the ulnar side of the back of the wrist and hand, divides into two dorsal digital branches; one supplies the ulnar side of the little finger; the other, the adjacent sides of the little and ring fingers.

It also sends a twig to join that given by the superficial branch of the radial nerve for the adjoining sides of the middle and ring fingers, and assists in supplying them.

A branch is distributed to the metacarpal region of the hand, communicating with a twig of the superficial branch of the radial nerve.

== Additional images ==
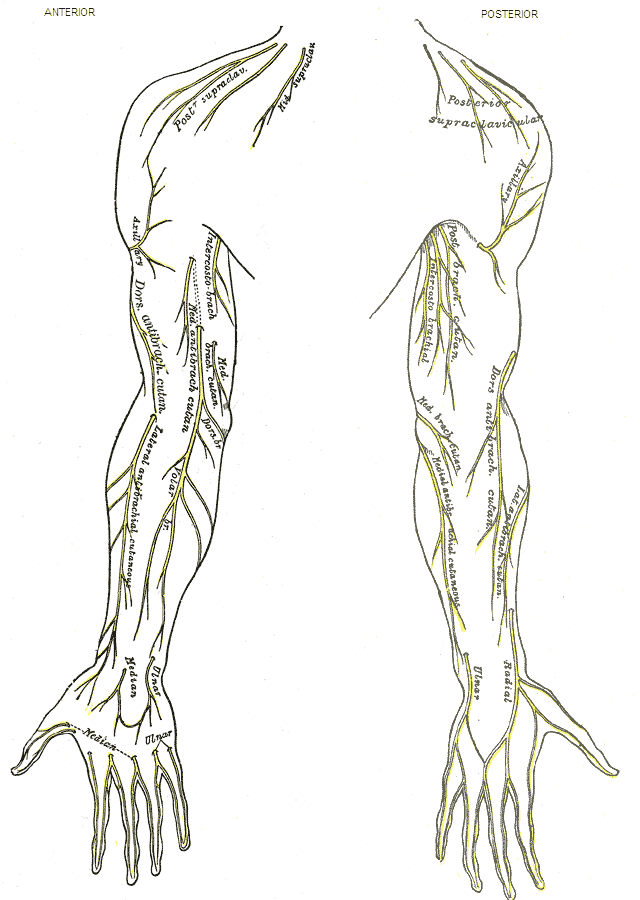
Cutaneous nerves of right upper extremity

Diagram of segmental distribution of the cutaneous nerves of the right upper extremity
