= Muscular branches of ulnar nerve =

Details
- From: ulnar nerve
- Innervates: Flexor carpi ulnaris, Flexor digitorum profundus

Identifiers
- Latin: rami musculares nervi ulnaris
- TA98: A14.2.03.041
- TA2: 6450
- FMA: 44874 75501, 44874

The muscular branches of ulnar nerve are a variety of branches of the ulnar nerve. One supplies the flexor carpi ulnaris muscle (a superficial muscle of the anterior compartment of the forearm), while the other supplies the ulnar half of the flexor digitorum profundus muscle (a deep muscle of the anterior compartment of the forearm).

== Structure ==
The muscular branches of the ulnar nerve arise at the elbow. Multiple branches may supply each muscle.

=== Variation ===
The branching pattern of the muscular branches of the ulnar nerve varies significantly.

== Function ==
The muscular branches of the ulnar nerve supply two flexor muscles of the anterior compartment of the forearm:

- flexor carpi ulnaris muscle, a superficial muscle.
- the ulnar / medial half of the flexor digitorum profundus muscle, a deep muscle.
