= Minium =

Minium may refer to:

- A monotypic genus of algae with species Minium parvum
- Minium (mineral)
- Minium (pigment)
