= Anterior compartment of the forearm =

Part of human anatomy

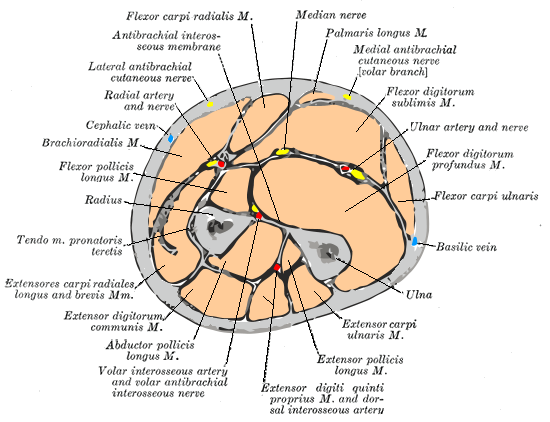
- Cross-section through the middle of the forearm. (Anterior compartment is at top; posterior compartment is at bottom.)

Details
- Artery: Ulnar artery
- Nerve: Median nerve (anterior interosseous nerve), ulnar nerve (muscular branches of ulnar nerve)

Identifiers
- Latin: compartimentum antebrachii anterius
- TA98: A04.6.01.004
- TA2: 2476
- FMA: 12255

The anterior compartment of the forearm (or flexor compartment) contains the following muscles:

Level	Muscle	Extrinsic/Intrinsic	Nerve
superficial	flexor carpi radialis	extrinsic	median
superficial	palmaris longus	extrinsic	median
superficial	flexor carpi ulnaris	extrinsic	ulnar
superficial	pronator teres	intrinsic	median
superficial (or intermediate)	flexor digitorum superficialis	extrinsic	median
deep	flexor digitorum profundus	extrinsic	ulnar + median (as anterior interosseous nerve)
deep	flexor pollicis longus	extrinsic	median (as anterior interosseous nerve)
deep	pronator quadratus	intrinsic	median (as anterior interosseous nerve)

The muscles are largely involved with flexion and supination. The superficial muscles have their origin on the common flexor tendon. The ulnar nerve and artery are also contained within this compartment. The flexor digitorum superficialis lies in between the other four muscles of the superficial group and the three muscles of the deep group. This is why it is also classified as the intermediate group.

== See also ==
- Compartment syndrome
- Posterior compartment of the forearm

== Additional images ==
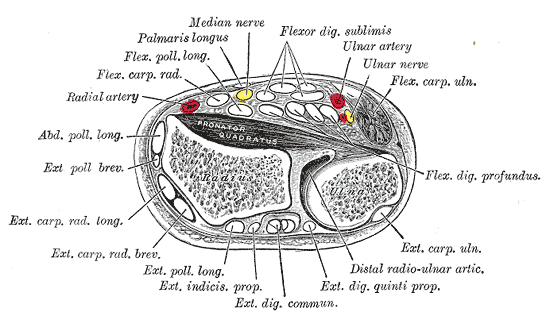
Transverse section across distal ends of radius and ulna.

Transverse section across the wrist and digits.
