= Ulnar claw =

Deformity of the hand that develops due to ulnar nerve damage

A hand imitating an ulnar claw. The metacarpophalangeal joints of the 4th and 5th fingers are extended, and the Interphalangeal joints of the same fingers are flexed.

An ulnar claw, also known as claw hand or Spinster’s Claw, is a deformity or an abnormal attitude of the hand that develops due to ulnar nerve damage, causing paralysis of the lumbricals. A claw hand presents with a hyperextension at the metacarpophalangeal joints and flexion at the proximal and distal interphalangeal joints of the 4th and 5th fingers. The patients with this condition can make a full fist, but when they extend their fingers, the hand posture is referred to as claw hand. The ring and little finger can usually not fully extend at the proximal interphalangeal joint (PIP).

This can be commonly confused with the hand of benediction or pope's blessing, which is caused by proximal (at elbow level) median nerve damage.

== Signs and symptoms ==
Patients exhibiting an ulnar claw are also very frequently unable to spread (abduct) or pull together (adduct) their fingers against resistance. This occurs because the ulnar nerve also innervates the palmar and dorsal interossei of the hand. Patients with this deficit will become increasingly easy to identify over time as the paralysed first dorsal interosseous muscle atrophies, leaving a prominent hollowing between the thumb and forefinger.

=== Ulnar nerve symptoms ===
The ulnar nerve runs from the shoulder to the hand, and damage to it results in the Ulnar claw. It is linked to palsy, which is a result of peripheral neuropathy. There are several ways that nerve damage can occur. Leaning on the elbow can lead to long-term wear and tear due to the prolonged pressure of the weight of the upper body. Symptoms resulting from leaning on the nerve can include numbness and tingling fingers.

== Causes ==
Common occupations such as cyclist, motorcyclist, and desk jobs prolong movement and elbow leaning. These activities involve pressure to the palms, which leads to cumulative damage to the nerve. When using a pizza cutter or similar hand tools which require downward pressure during use, applying upper body weight to push down on the tool over time can cause damage to the nerve.

== Pathogenesis ==
An ulnar claw may follow an ulnar nerve lesion which results in the partial or complete denervation of the ulnar (medial) two lumbricals of the hand. Since the ulnar nerve also innervates the 3rd and 4th lumbricals, which flex the MCP joints (aka the knuckles), their denervation causes these joints to become extended by the now unopposed action of the long finger extensors (namely the extensor digitorum and the extensor digiti minimi). The lumbricals and interossei also extend the IP (interphalangeal) joints of the fingers by insertion into the extensor hood; their paralysis results in weakened extension. The combination of hyperextension at the MCP and flexion at the IP joints gives the hand its claw-like appearance.

=== Ulnar paradox ===
The ulnar nerve also innervates the ulnar (medial) half of the flexor digitorum profundus muscle (FDP). If the ulnar nerve lesion occurs more proximally (closer to the elbow), the flexor digitorum profundus muscle may also be denervated. As a result, flexion of the IP joints is weakened, which reduces the claw-like appearance of the hand. (Instead, the fourth and fifth fingers are paralyzed in their fully extended position.) This is called the "ulnar paradox" because one would normally expect a more proximal and thus debilitating injury to result in a more deformed appearance.

As reinnervation occurs along the ulnar nerve after a high lesion, the deformity gets worse (FDP reinnervated) as the patient recovers - hence the use of the term "paradox". A simple way to remember this is: 'the closer to the Paw, the worse the Claw'.

== Prevention ==
Preventive therapy is recommended to preserve the function of the fingers. This may include physical exercise, stretching, proper bodily function, and myofascial release (massage, foam roller). Exercises focus on the forearm muscles, such as the extensor carpi ulnaris; extensor digitorum, to antagonize the flexion of the fingers.

Massaging the forearm muscles also alleviates the tightness that occurs with muscles exertion. Stretching allows the muscles more flexibility, decreasing interference with the innervations of the ulnar nerve to the fingers.

The so-called Hand of Benediction is caused by median nerve lesions. The hand will show hyperextension of the metacarpophalangeal joints (MCP) from the unopposed extensor digitorum as well as weakened extension and flexion of the Interphalangeal (IP) joints of the 2nd and 3rd digits (index and middle) due to deficits in the radial lumbricals and lateral half of the flexor digitorum profundus. The pathogenesis is similar to that of ulnar clawing (loss of the relevant lumbricals and the flexor digitorum profundus, along with unopposed action of forearm extensors), and a median claw hand will appear similar to an ulnar claw when the patient with a median claw is asked to make a fist.

The following signs may be used to distinguish median nerve clawing from ulnar nerve clawing clinically.

Ulnar nerve	Median nerve
Deficit is primarily in 4th and 5th fingers	Deficit is primarily in 2nd and 3rd fingers.
Deficit is most prominent at rest and when the patient is asked to extend his fingers.	Deficit is most prominent when the patient is asked to make a fist.
Often accompanied by inability to abduct or adduct the 2nd, 3rd, 4th, and 5th finger.	Often accompanied by difficulty opposing the thumb.
Often accompanied by apparent atrophy of the first dorsal interosseous muscle of the hand	Often accompanied by wasting of muscles of the thenar eminence

=== Dupuytren's contracture ===
Dupuytren's contracture is a deformity of the hand due to thickening and fibrosis of the palmar aponeurosis and eventual contracture of the 4th and 5th digits. Presenting as a small hard nodule in the base of the ring finger, it tends to affect the ring and little finger with puckering and adherence of the palmar aponeurosis to the skin. Eventually, the MCP and IP joints of the 4th and 5th digits become permanently flexed. This claw appearance can be distinguished from an ulnar claw in that the MCP is flexed in Dupuytren's but hyperextended in ulnar nerve injuries.

=== Klumpke paralysis ===
A claw hand can result from injuries to the inferior brachial plexus (C8–T1). The condition may arise from the limb being suddenly pulled upward. For example, Klumpke paralysis can occur from excessive pulling of the infant's forelimb during parturition.

== Treatment ==
Treatments excluding surgery can include physical therapy and occupational therapy rehabilitation. Range of motion can be regained by using hand splints to stretch the impaired hand and to prevent overstretching. Using splints will initiate flexion in the metacarpophalangeal joints while also allowing extensions and flexion in the interphalangeal joints, thus increasing range of motion.

Beneficial exercise will be any that strengthens the interosseous muscles and lumbricals. By exercising individual fingers and thumb in adduction and abduction motion in pronation position, the interosseous muscles will gain strength. Exercises to strengthen lumbricals, flexion of the metacarpophalangeal joint, and extension in the interphalangeal joints are beneficial. Repetitive motions of pronation and supination are also effective exercises for rehabilitation. Exercising pronation and supination with a handle or screwdriver attachment will help stimulate the nerves. A lateral pinch and recurring grip can also be applied for supination and pronation.

== Incidence ==
Older males are more likely to have ulnar mononeuropathy than females without regard to BMI. 95% of females with a BMI less than a 22.0 have a higher risk of ulnar nerve damage from a lack of adipose “cushion”, and external compression at the elbow is a more important cause of ulnar mononeuropathy among females than males. Both males and females with high grip strength, such as string musicians, are more susceptible to ulnar mononeuropathy, as are those who experience severe or sustained compression of the ulnar nerve.
