= Palmaris brevis muscle =

Muscle of the hand

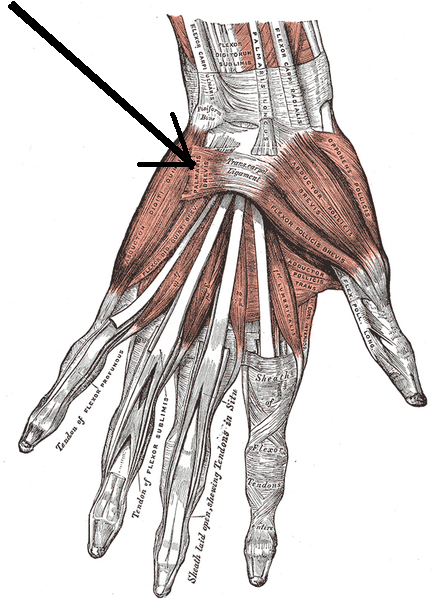
- The muscles of the left hand. Palmar surface (palmaris brevis visible at center left).

Details
- Origin: Flexor retinaculum (medial) and palmar aponeurosis
- Insertion: Palm
- Artery: Palmar metacarpal artery
- Nerve: Superficial branch of ulnar nerve
- Actions: Pulls on skin over hypothenar eminence, deepening the cup of the palm and so improving grip

Identifiers
- Latin: musculus palmaris brevis
- TA98: A04.6.02.053
- TA2: 2520
- FMA: 37381

Palmaris brevis muscle is a thin, quadrilateral muscle, placed beneath the integument of the ulnar side of the hand. It acts to fold the skin of the hypothenar eminence transversally.

== Structure ==
=== Origin and insertion ===
Palmaris brevis muscle is located on the ulnar side of the hand. It arises from the tendinous fasciculi from the transverse carpal ligament and palmar aponeurosis. The muscle fibres are inserted into the skin on the ulnar border of the palm of the hand, and occasionally on the pisiform bone.

=== Innervation ===
Palmaris brevis muscle is the only muscle innervated by the superficial branch of the ulnar nerve (C8, T1).

=== Blood supply ===
Palmaris brevis muscle is supplied by the palmar metacarpal artery of the deep palmar arch.

== Discovery ==
The first recorded observation of the muscle is by Italian anatomist Giambattista Canano sometime before 1543. The muscle was independently discovered a few years later by Realdo Colombo before being pushed to general acceptance in the works of Andreas Vesalius.

== Function ==
Palmaris brevis muscle tenses the skin of the palm on the ulnar side during a grip action. It also deepens the hollow of the palm. The palmaris brevis may protect the ulnar nerve and ulnar artery from compressive forces during repetitive grasping actions. The muscle has a fatigue-resistant fiber type profile, which supports the idea of a protective function to the ulnar neurovasculature during repetitive intermittent grasping tasks.

== See also ==
- Thenar eminence
- Palmar interossei muscles
- Palmaris longus muscle

== Additional images ==
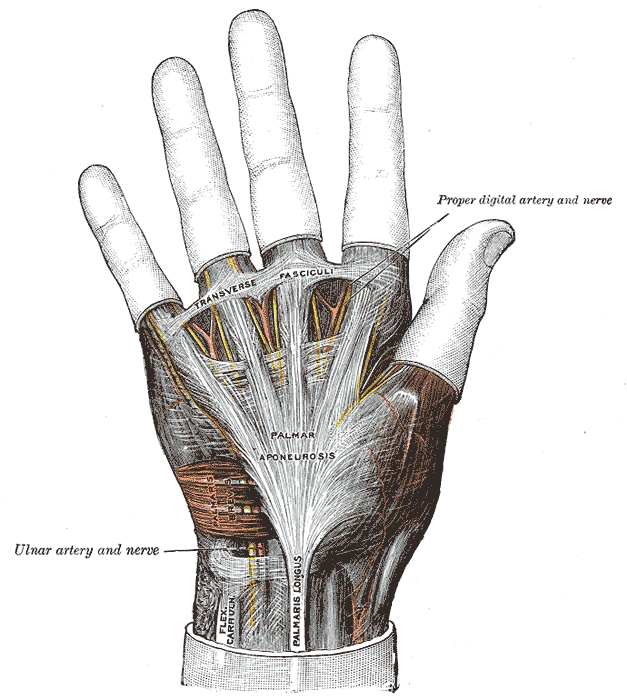
The palmar aponeurosis
