= Deep branch of ulnar nerve =

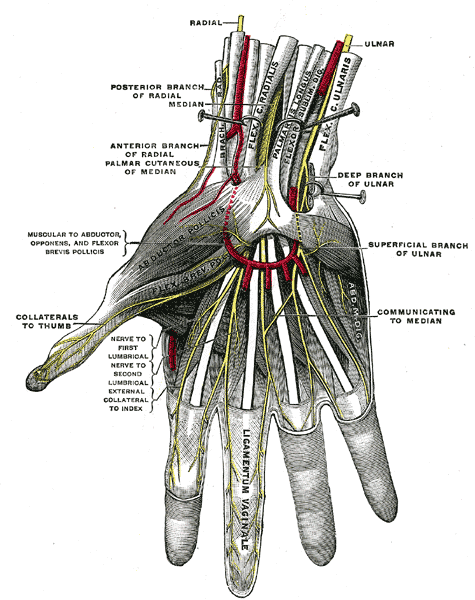
- Superficial palmar nerves. (Deep branch of ulnar labeled at center right.)

Details
- From: palmar branch of ulnar nerve
- Innervates: dorsal interossei, palmar interossei, lumbricals #3 and 4, adductor pollicis, hypothenar eminence

Identifiers
- Latin: ramus profundus nervi ulnaris
- TA98: A14.2.03.048
- TA2: 6457
- FMA: 44877

The deep branch of the ulnar nerve is a terminal, primarily motor branch of the ulnar nerve. It is accompanied by the deep palmar branch of ulnar artery.

== Structure ==
It passes between the abductor digiti minimi and the flexor digiti minimi brevis. It then perforates the opponens digiti minimi and follows the course of the deep palmar arch beneath the flexor tendons. As the deep ulnar nerve passes across the palm, it lies in a fibrous tunnel formed between the hook of the hamate and the pisiform (Guyon's canal).

== Function ==
At its origin it innervates the hypothenar muscles. As it crosses the deep part of the hand, it innervates all the interosseous muscles and the third and fourth lumbricals. It ends by innervating the adductor pollicis and the medial (deep) head of the flexor pollicis brevis. It also sends articular filaments to the wrist-joint (following Hilton's law).
