= MINIM =

Spanish industrial rock band

- Origin: Vigo, Galicia, Spain
- Genres: Industrial rock, industrial metal, punk rock
- Years active: 2006–present
- Label: Mutante Records
- Members: Fran Pajares; Tino Álvarez; Aitor Míguez; Rober Escrich; Nacho González
- Past members: Gerry González, Iago Lorenzo, Hal 9000 (Los Piratas)
- Website: www.minim-music.com

MINIM is a Spanish industrial rock band founded in 2006 in Vigo, Galicia.

== History ==
The band was born in late 2006 in Vigo, when they recorded their first EP with four tracks 22:22 and 2 remixes.

After playing in 2007 all over Spain, MINIM decided to take a little break.

In mid-2008, the band reappeared with some lineup changes. Continue in lead vocals, Fran Pajares and on synths, vocals and guitars, Tino Álvarez. To they are joined on guitar, Aitor Míguez, on bass guitar, Robert Escrich and drummer Nacho González. They continued giving concerts, offering them a great show of lights and images, which no doubt characterized the band. They began to receive the first recognitions, winning several awards and competitions like XII Concuros de Pop Rock de Rivas Vaciamadrid. The press also began to take note, and they also got some minutes on the radio waves.

In March 2010, come onto the market their first album 9567: Here even it's yesterday. This album was released with Mutant-e Records under license from Creative Commons, and it published on their website to be downloaded freely. This will mark a turning point in the history of the band because from their server the album achieved 1350 downloads in three months, and the name of MINIM starts ringing throughout Europe, Russia, Japan and the United States.

== Discography ==
Year	Name	Format
2006	22:22	EP
2009	Avance 2009	EP
2009	MINIM Live	DVD
2010	9567: Here even it's yesterday	LP

Collections in which they appear:

Year	Name	Company
2007	La Tierra de los Sueños Vol.4	Gente Gótica
2009	Aequilibrium: man vs machine	Mutant-e Records
2010	Laboratorio de Sonidos Vol.1	In Vento Records
2010	Gothic Visions II	Echozone Records
2010	Crank Music Vol.1	Crank Music Prod.
2011	Aequilibrium 2.0	Mutant-e Records
