= Hypothenar eminence =

Group of three muscles of the palm

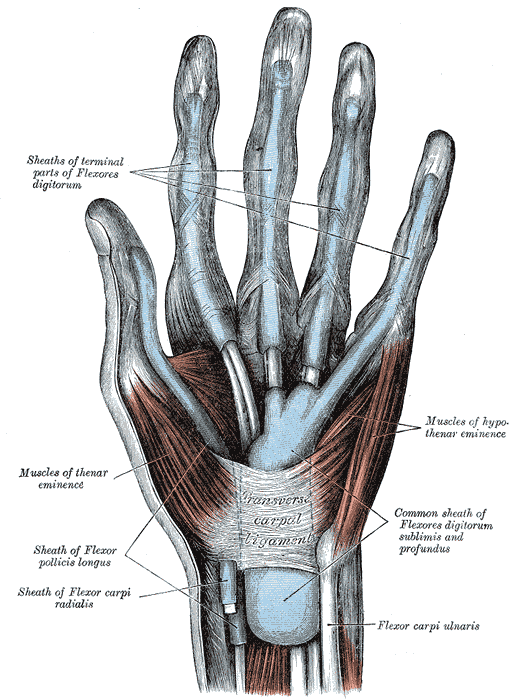
- The mucous sheaths of the tendons on the front of the wrist and digits. (Hypothenar eminence labeled at center right.)

- Transverse section across the wrist and digits. (Muscles of little finger labeled at upper right.)

Details
- Insertion: 5th metacarpal and proximal phalynx
- Artery: Ulnar artery
- Nerve: Deep branch of ulnar nerve
- Actions: Control movement of the 5th digit

Identifiers
- Latin: eminentia hypothenaris
- TA98: A01.2.07.024
- TA2: 307
- FMA: 61523

The hypothenar muscles are a group of three muscles of the palm that control the motion of the little finger.

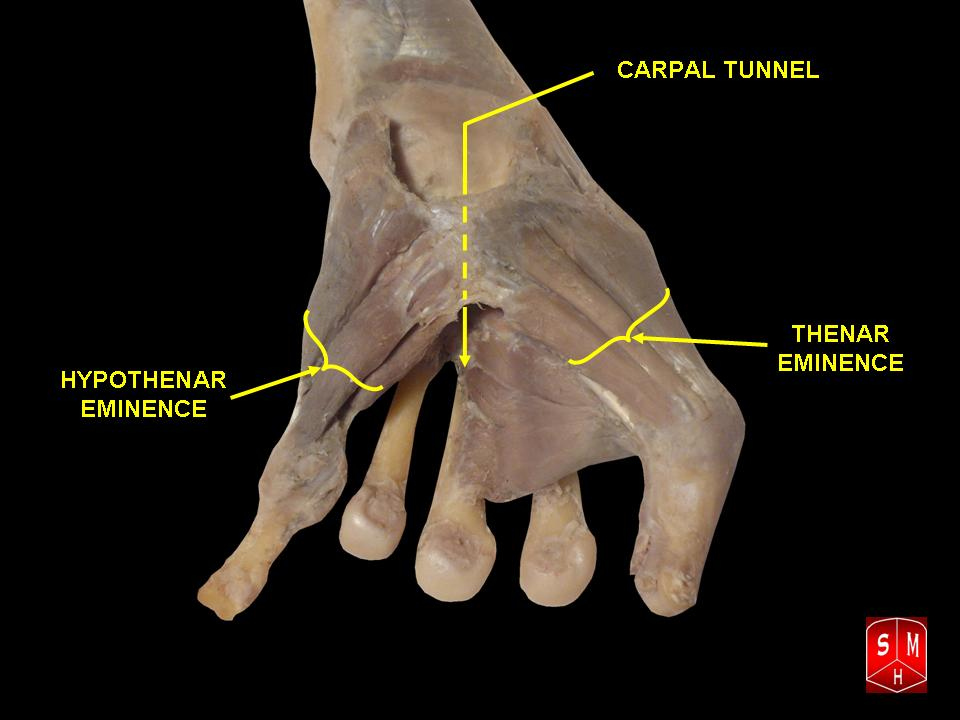
Carpal tunnel and thenar and hypothenar eminences

The three muscles are:

- Abductor digiti minimi
- Flexor digiti minimi brevis
- Opponens digiti minimi

== Structure ==
The muscles of hypothenar eminence are from lateral to medial:

- Opponens digiti minimi
- Flexor digiti minimi brevis
- Abductor digiti minimi

The intrinsic muscles of hand can be remembered using the mnemonic, "A OF A OF A" for, Abductor pollicis brevis, Opponens pollicis, Flexor pollicis brevis (the three thenar muscles), Adductor pollicis, and the three hypothenar muscles, Opponens digiti minimi, Flexor digiti minimi brevis, Abductor digiti minimi.

== Clinical significance ==
"Hypothenar atrophy" is associated with the lesion of the ulnar nerve, which supplies the three hypothenar muscles.

Hypothenar hammer syndrome is a vascular occlusion of this region.

== See also ==
- Thenar eminence
- Palmaris brevis
