= Extensor digiti minimi muscle =

Muscle of the forearm

Extensor digiti minimi
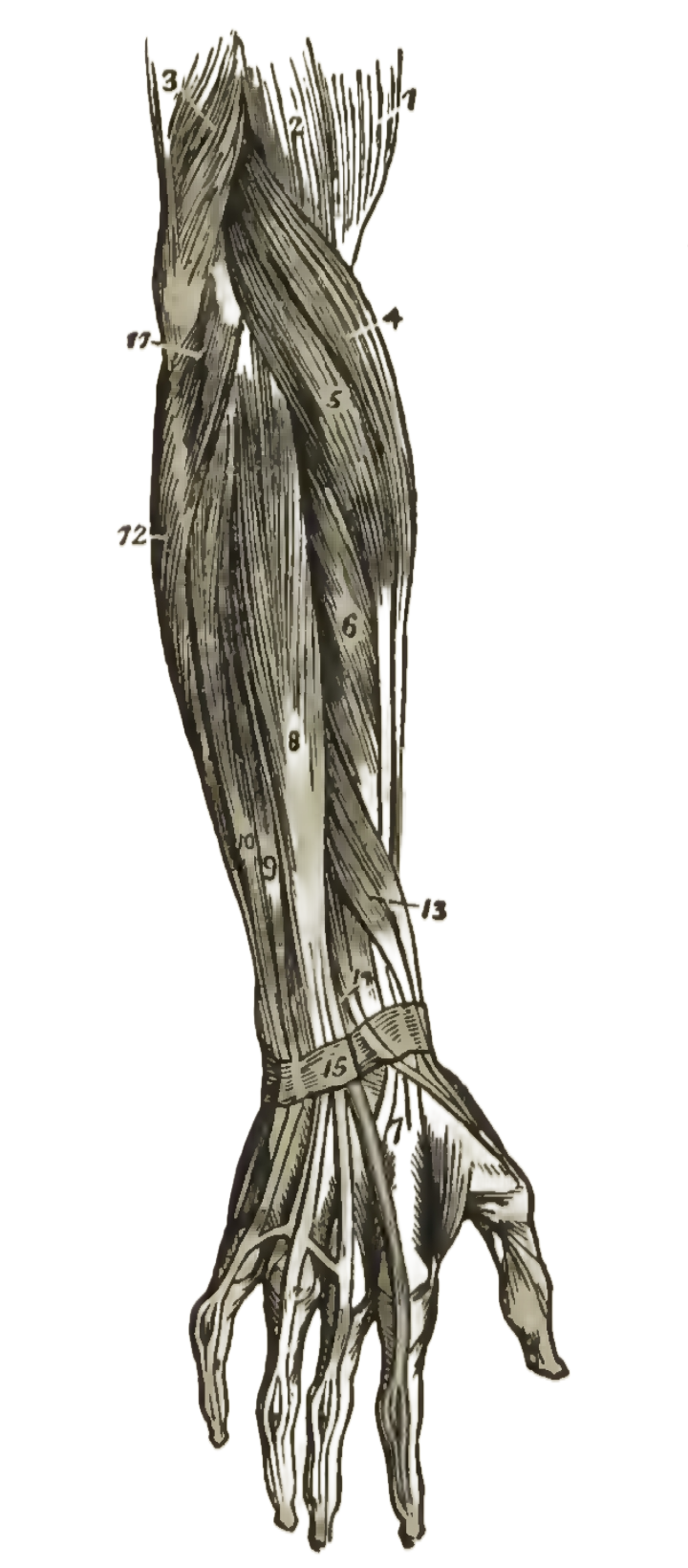
- The superficial layer of muscles of the posterior aspect of the right forearm. (Extensor digiti minimi labeled 9 at center left.)

Details
- Origin: The anterior portion of the lateral epicondyle of the humerus (common extensor tendon)
- Insertion: At the extensor expansion, located at the base of the middle and distal phalanx of digit V on the dorsal side
- Artery: Posterior interosseous artery
- Nerve: Posterior interosseous nerve (C7, 8)
- Actions: Extends the wrist and the little finger at all joints
- Antagonist: Flexor digiti minimi brevis

Identifiers
- Latin: musculus extensor digiti minimi
- TA98: A04.6.02.044
- TA2: 2506
- FMA: 38503

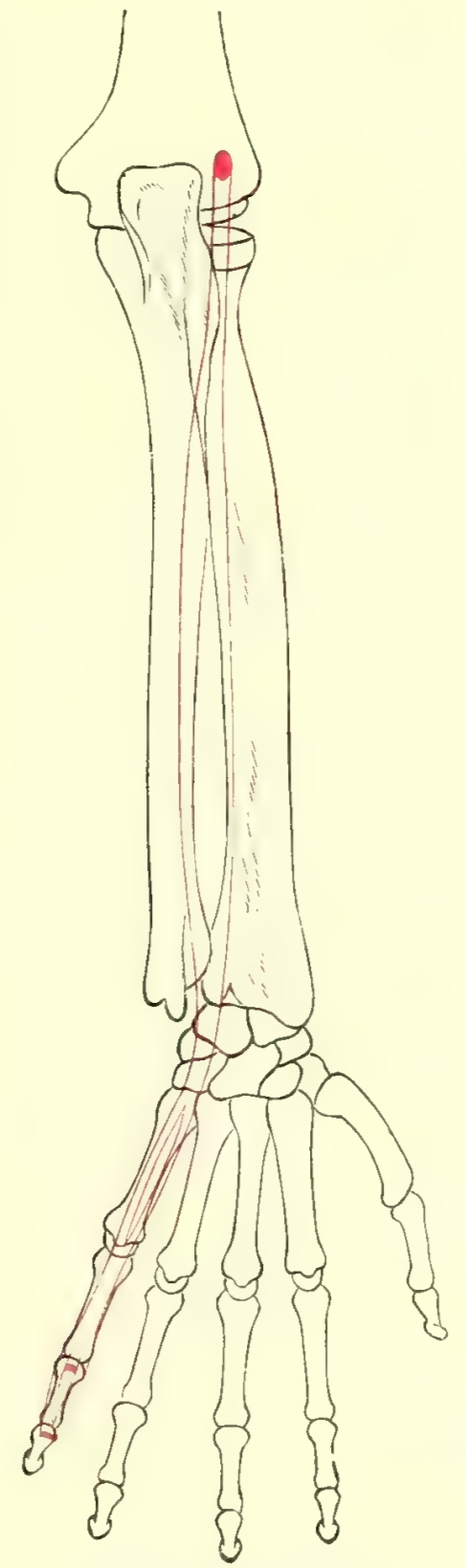
Extensor digiti minimi: outline and attachment footprints. (After Gerrish.)

The extensor digiti minimi (extensor digiti quinti proprius) is a slender muscle of the forearm, placed on the ulnar side of the extensor digitorum communis, with which it is generally connected.

It arises from the common extensor tendon by a thin tendinous slip and frequently from the intermuscular septa between it and the adjacent muscles.

Its tendon passes through a compartment of the extensor retinaculum, posterior to distal radio-ulnar joint, then divides into two as it crosses the dorsum of the hand, and finally joins the extensor digitorum tendon. All three tendons attach to the dorsal digital expansion of the fifth digit (little finger). There may be a slip of tendon to the fourth digit.

== Variations ==
- An additional fibrous slip from the lateral epicondyle: The tendon of insertion may not divide or may send a slip to the ring finger.
- Absence of the muscle is rare; fusion of the belly with the extensor digitorum communis is not uncommon.
- Variations of the fifth extensor compartment, which the extensor digiti minimi runs through, may cause tenosynovitis and can limit the use of the extensor digiti minimi.
- The extensor digiti minimi can also be bifurcated, which means split, at many different points in the muscle.

== Functions ==
The extensor digiti minimi is a two joint muscle. It acts as an extensor in both joints. It extends the wrist, which means it moves the back of the hand toward the back of the forearm. It also extends the little finger, which means it straightens the little finger from a fist.

== Additional images ==
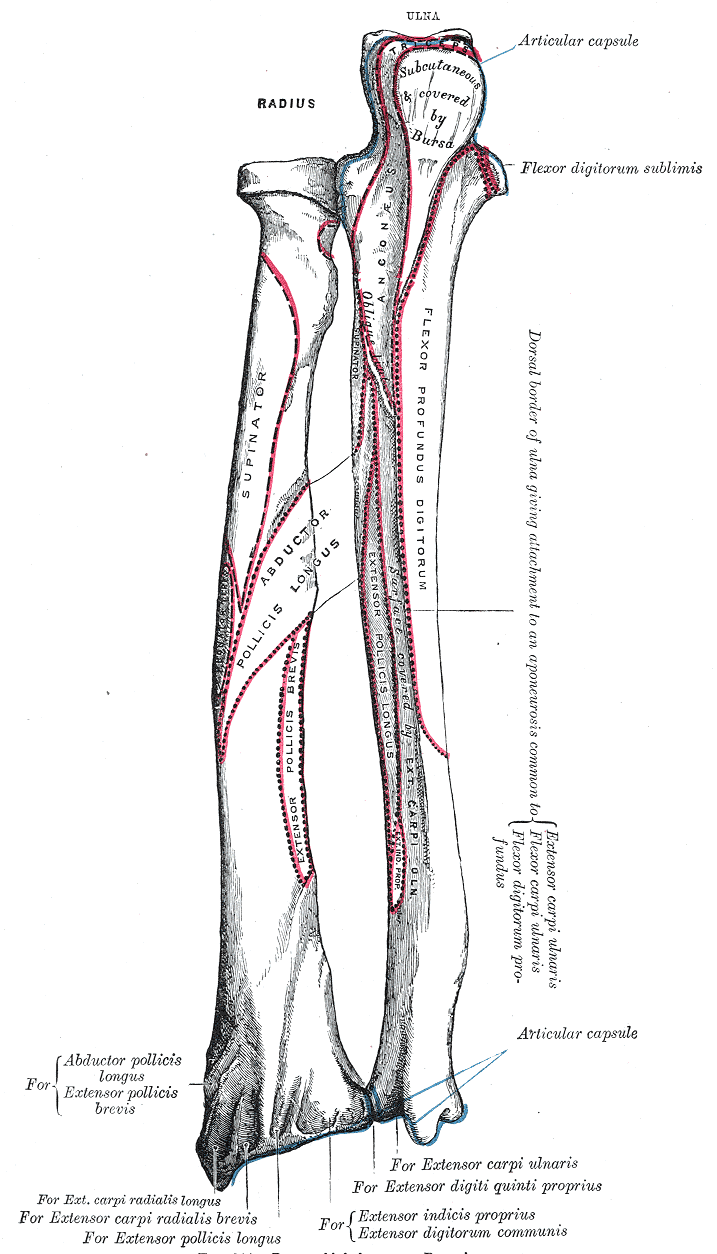
Bones of left forearm. Posterior aspect.

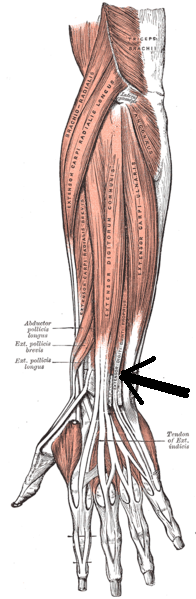
Posterior surface of the forearm. Superficial muscles.

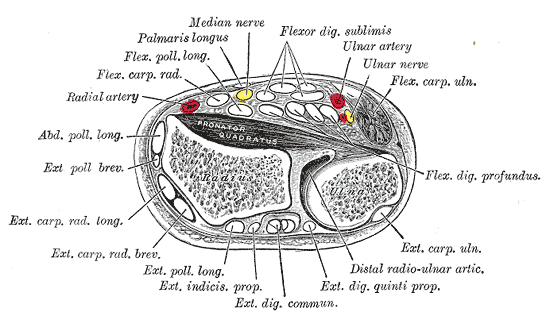
Transverse section across distal ends of radius and ulna.

Transverse section across the wrist and digits.

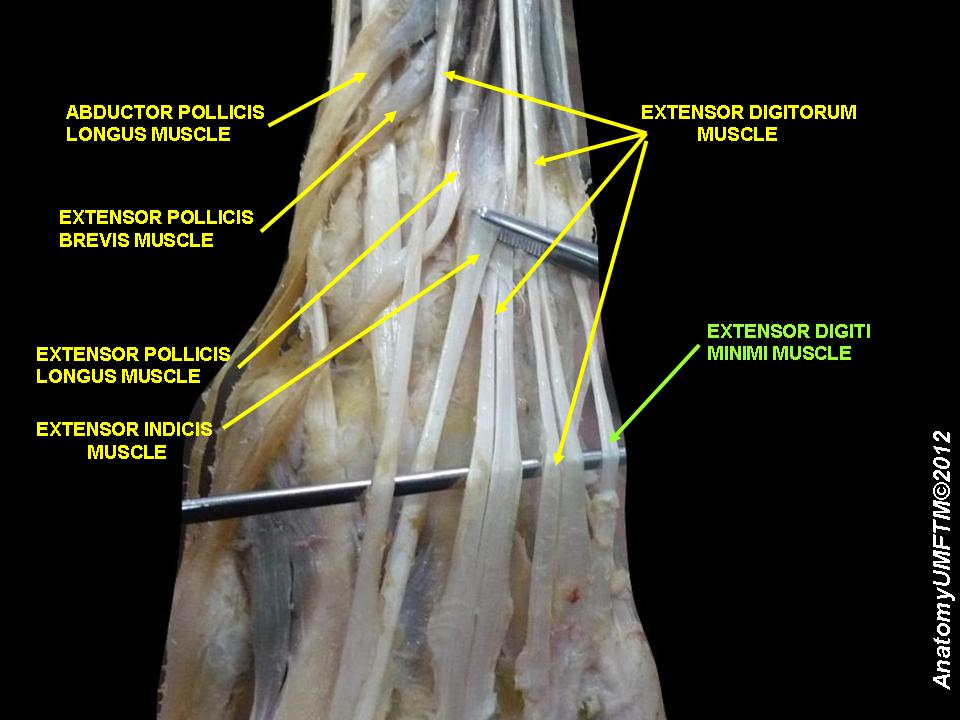
Extensor digiti minimi muscle

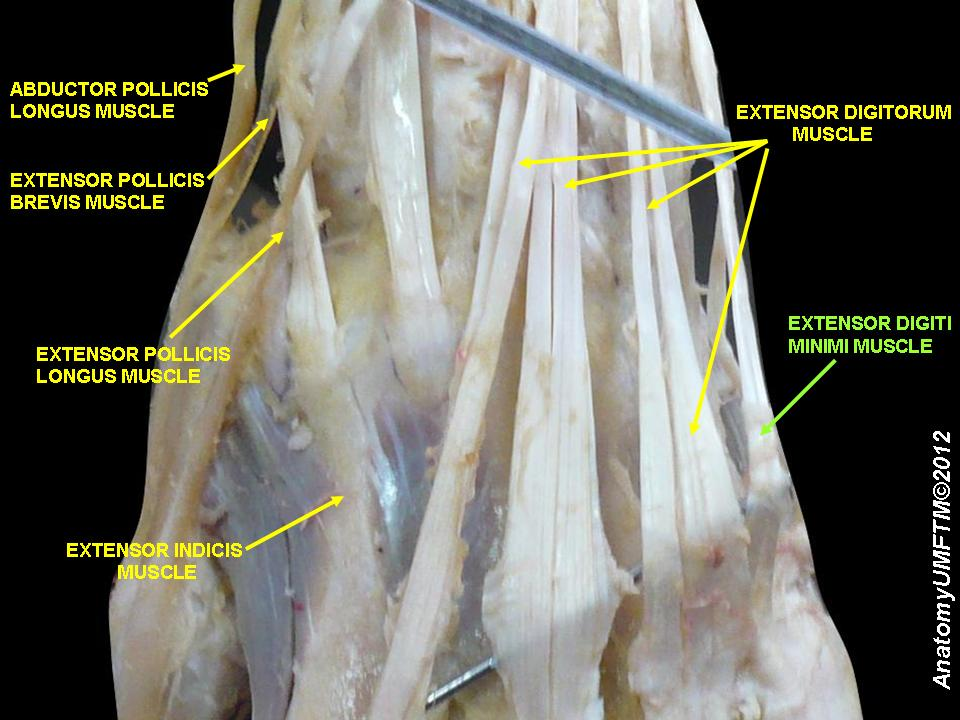
Extensor digiti minimi muscle

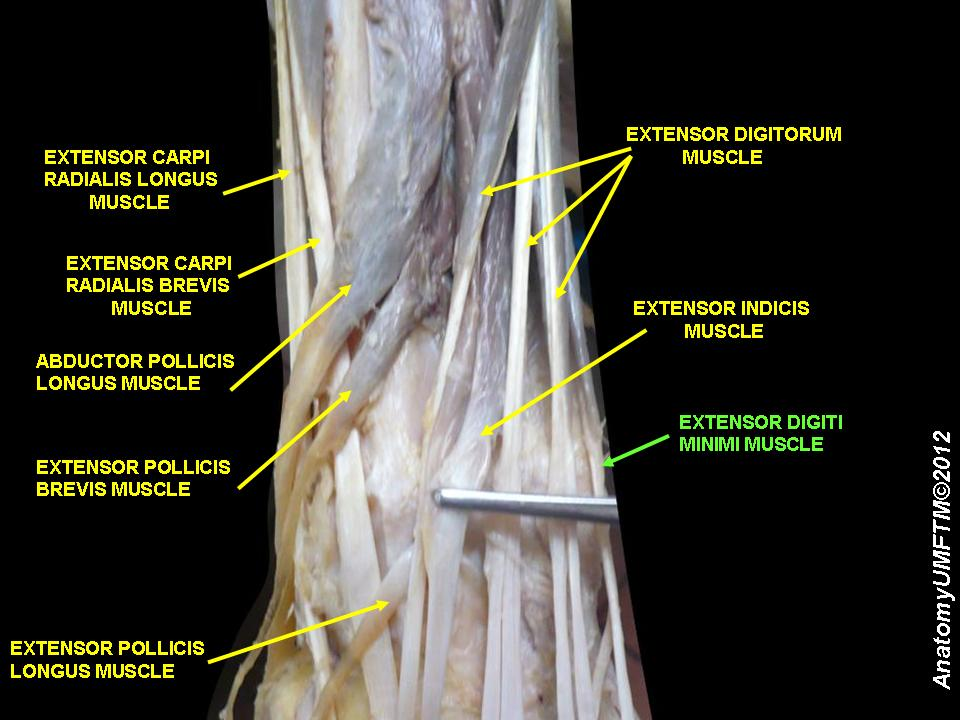
Extensor digiti minimi muscle

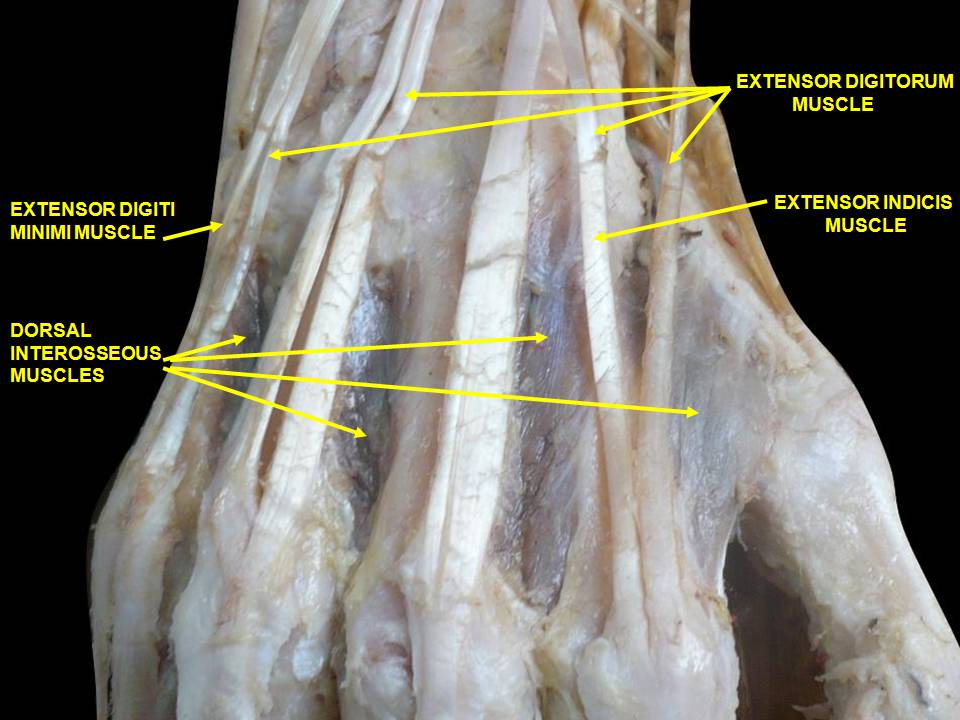
Muscles of hand. Posterior view.

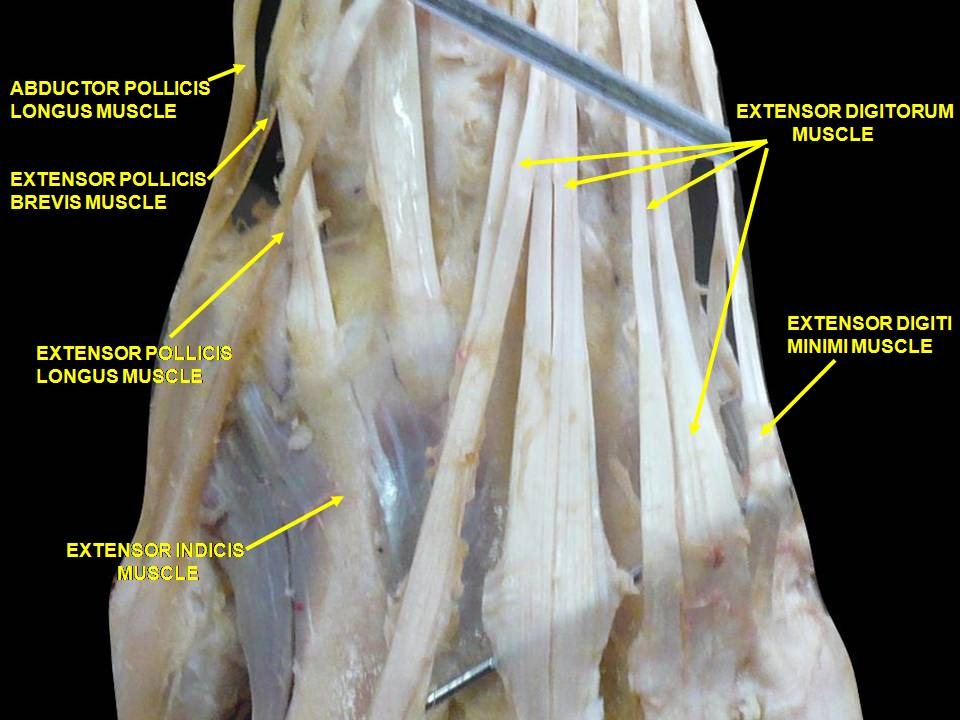
Muscles of hand. Posterior view.
