= Minium parvum =

Scientific classification
- Domain: Eukaryota
- Clade: Archaeplastida
- Division: Rhodophyta
- Class: Florideophyceae
- Order: Rhodymeniales
- Family: Fryeellaceae
- Genus: Minium; R.L.Moe, 1979
- Species: M. parvum

Binomial name
- Minium parvum R.L.Moe, 1979

Genus of algae

Minium is a genus of thalloid algae. The thalli take a crustose form.

== Species ==
The only species currently recognised is Minium parvum.
