= Abductor digiti minimi muscle of the hand =

Muscle in the hypothenar compartment

Abductor digiti minimi muscle of hand
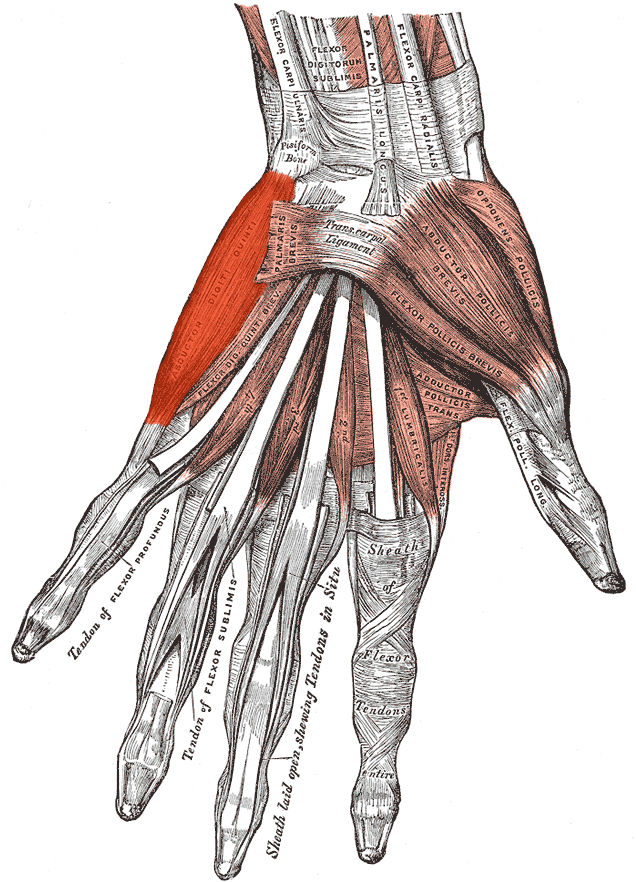
- The muscles of the left hand seen from palmar surface (abductor digiti minimi is shaded in bright red)

Details
- Origin: Pisiform bone, the pisohamate ligament, and the flexor retinaculum
- Insertion: Base of the proximal phalanx of the 5th digit on the ulnar or medial side
- Artery: Ulnar artery
- Nerve: Deep branch of ulnar nerve
- Actions: Abducts little finger

Identifiers
- Latin: musculus abductor digiti minimi manus
- TA98: A04.6.02.062
- TA2: 2529
- FMA: 37382

In human anatomy, the abductor digiti minimi (abductor minimi digiti, abductor digiti quinti, ADM) is a skeletal muscle situated on the ulnar border of the palm of the hand. It forms the ulnar border of the palm and its spindle-like shape defines the hypothenar eminence of the palm together with the skin, connective tissue, and fat surrounding it. Its main function is to pull the little finger away from the other fingers (i.e. abduction).

== Structure ==
The abductor digiti minimi arises from the pisiform bone, the pisohamate ligament, and the flexor retinaculum.

Its distal tendon ends in three slips that are inserted into the ulnopalmar margin of the proximal phalanx, the palmar plate of the metacarpophalangeal joint, and the sesamoid bone when present. Some fibers insert into the finger's dorsal aponeurosis, which is why the muscle acts similar to a dorsal interosseus muscle.

Additionally, the ulnar-most portion of the tendon inserts into the little finger's digital cord, and the muscle thus forms part of a structure that flexes the metacarpophalangeal joint and extends the interphalangeal joints.

=== Innervation ===
It is innervated by the deep branch of the ulnar nerve (C8–T1).

=== Development ===
The abductor digit minimi develops at an early stage from an ulnar muscle primordium of the superficial layer of the original undifferentiated mesenchyme of the hand, together with the flexor digitorum superficialis (medial primordia) and the abductor pollicis brevis (radial). In contrast, the remaining hypothenar muscles are derived from the deep layer at a later stage.

=== Variation ===
In rare cases accessory fascicles of the abductor digiti minimi have been found arising from the antebrachial fascia, the radius, and the ulna.

The abductor digiti minimi is the most variable hypothenar muscle, and might be joined by accessory slips from the tendon of the flexor carpi ulnaris, the flexor retinaculum, the fascia of the distal forearm, or the tendon of the palmaris longus. Occasionally, the muscle is partially inserted onto the fifth metacarpal bone.

In case of polydactyly it may insert to the sixth finger instead, if there is one.

== Function ==
It is an abductor of the little finger at the metacarpophalangeal joint.

It is also possible that the muscle contributes to extension of the middle phalanx of the little finger through its connection to finger's extensor mechanism.

It plays an important role when the hand is grasping large objects with outspread fingers.

== Etymology ==
The name is derived from the Latin -ab "away from"; ducere "to draw"; digitus, "digit"; and minimum, smallest; or quintus, "fifth", meaning "abductor of the smallest or fifth finger".

== See also ==
- Abductor digiti minimi muscle of foot

== Additional images ==
Transverse section across the wrist and digits.

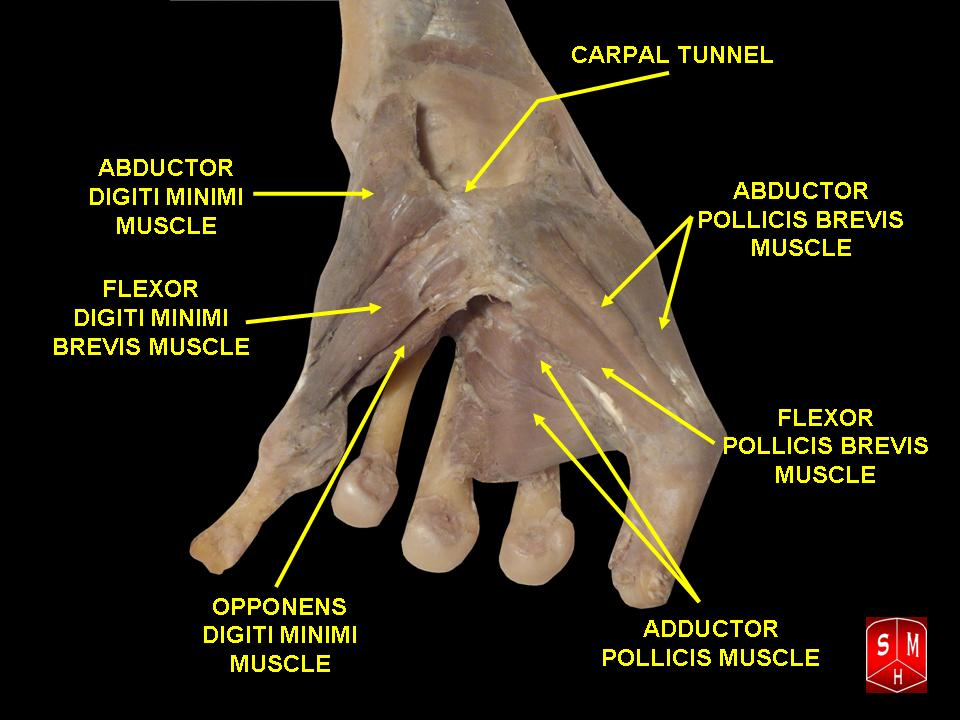
Abductor digiti minimi muscle

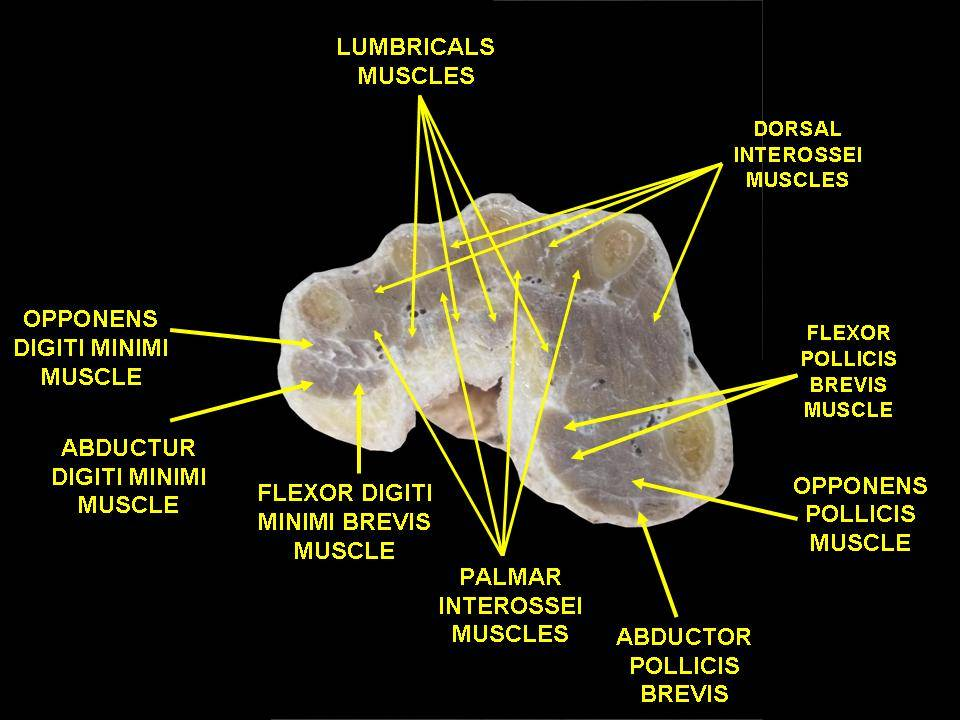
Muscles of hand. Cross section.
