= Flexor retinaculum of the hand =

Thickened fascia over the carpal tunnel

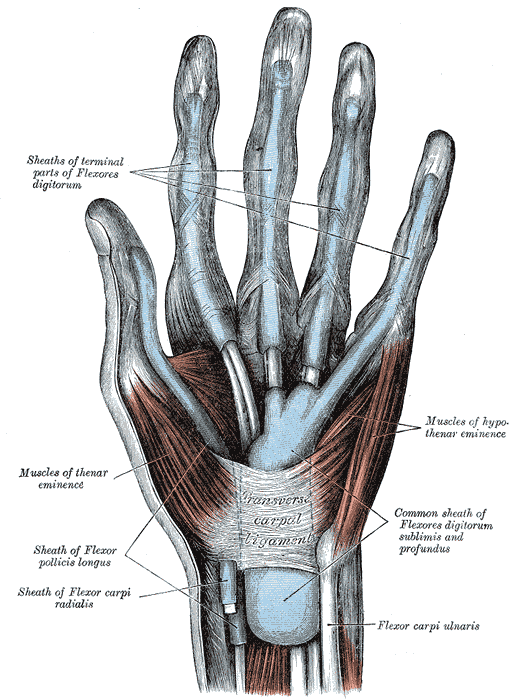
- The mucous sheaths of the tendons on the front of the wrist and digits (right hand pictured). The Transverse Carpal Ligament (TCL) is labeled at center. Although it’s not obvious in the depiction, the TCL is on the palm side of the tendons.

Details

Identifiers
- Latin: retinaculum musculorum flexorum manus (obsolete: ligamentum transversum carpi)
- TA98: A04.6.03.013
- TA2: 2550
- FMA: 39988

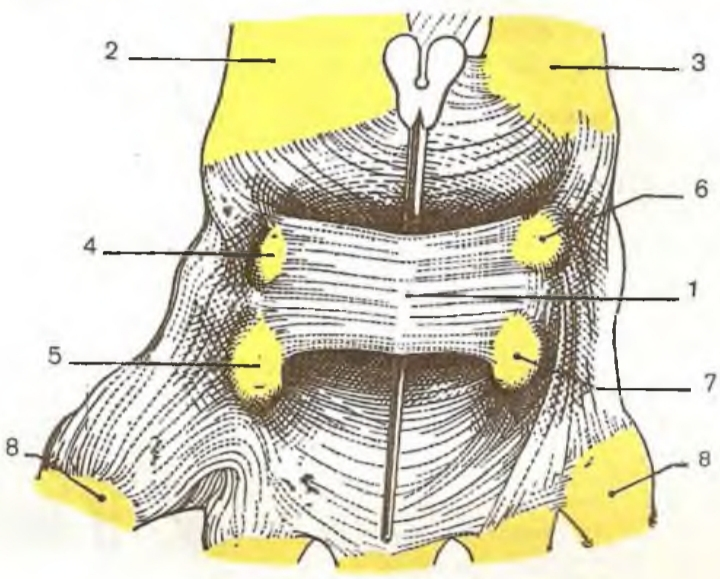
Flexor retinaculum of the right upper limb. 1, flexor retinaculum — 2, radius — 3, ulna — 4, scaphoid (tubercle) — 5, trapezium (tubercle) — 6, pisiform — 7, hamate (hook) — 8, metacarpals. (After Testut.)

The flexor retinaculum (transverse carpal ligament or anterior annular ligament) is a fibrous band on the palmar side of the hand near the wrist. It arches over the carpal bones of the hands, covering them and forming the carpal tunnel.

== Structure ==
The flexor retinaculum is a strong, fibrous band that covers the carpal bones on the palmar side of the hand near the wrist. It attaches to the bones near the radius and ulna. On the ulnar side, the flexor retinaculum attaches to the pisiform bone and the hook of the hamate bone. On the radial side, it attaches to the tubercle of the scaphoid bone, and to the medial part of the palmar surface and the tubercle of the trapezium bone.

The upper border of the flexor retinaculum corresponds to the distal (lower) transverse skin crease in front of the wrist and is continuous with the deep fascia of the forearm. The lower border is attached to the palmar aponeurosis.

The flexor retinaculum is continuous with the palmar carpal ligament, and deeper with the palmar aponeurosis. The ulnar artery and ulnar nerve, and the cutaneous branches of the median and ulnar nerves, pass on top of the flexor retinaculum. On the radial side of the retinaculum is the tendon of the flexor carpi radialis, which lies in the groove on the greater multangular between the attachments of the ligament to the bone.

The tendons of the palmaris longus and flexor carpi ulnaris are partly attached to the surface of the retinaculum; below, the short muscles of the thumb and little finger originate from the flexor retinaculum.

== Function ==
The flexor retinaculum is the roof of the carpal tunnel, through which the median nerve and tendons of muscles which flex the hand pass.

== Clinical significance ==
In carpal tunnel syndrome, one of the tendons or tissues in the carpal tunnel is inflamed, swollen, or fibrotic and puts pressure on the other structures in the tunnel, including the median nerve. Carpal tunnel syndrome is the most commonly reported nerve entrapment syndrome. It is often associated with repetitive motions of the wrist and fingers. It is because of this that pianists, meat cutters, and people with jobs involving extensive typing are at particularly high risk. The tough flexor retinaculum along with the rest of the carpal tunnel cannot expand, putting pressure on the median nerve running through the carpal tunnel with the flexor tendons of the wrist. This results in the symptoms of carpal tunnel syndrome.

Symptoms of carpal tunnel syndrome include tingling sensations and muscle weakness in the palm and lateral side of the hand and palm. It is possible that the syndrome may extend and radiate up the nerve causing pain to the arm and shoulder.

Carpal tunnel syndrome may be treated surgically. This is usually done after all non-surgical methods of treatment have been exhausted. Non-surgical treatment methods include anti-inflammatory drugs. The wrist may be immobilized in order to prevent further use and inflammation. When surgery is needed, the flexor retinaculum is either completely severed or lengthened. Surgery to divide the flexor retinaculum is the most common procedure. The scar tissue will eventually fill the gap left by surgery. The intent is that this will lengthen the flexor retinaculum enough to accommodate inflamed or damaged tendons and reduce the effects of compression on the median nerve. In a 2004 double blind-study, researchers concluded that there was no perceivable benefit gained from lengthening the flexor retinaculum during surgery and so division of the ligament remains the preferred method of surgery.

== See also ==
- Fibular retinacula
- Extensor retinaculum of the hand
