= Muscles of the thumb =

Set of nine human skeletal muscles

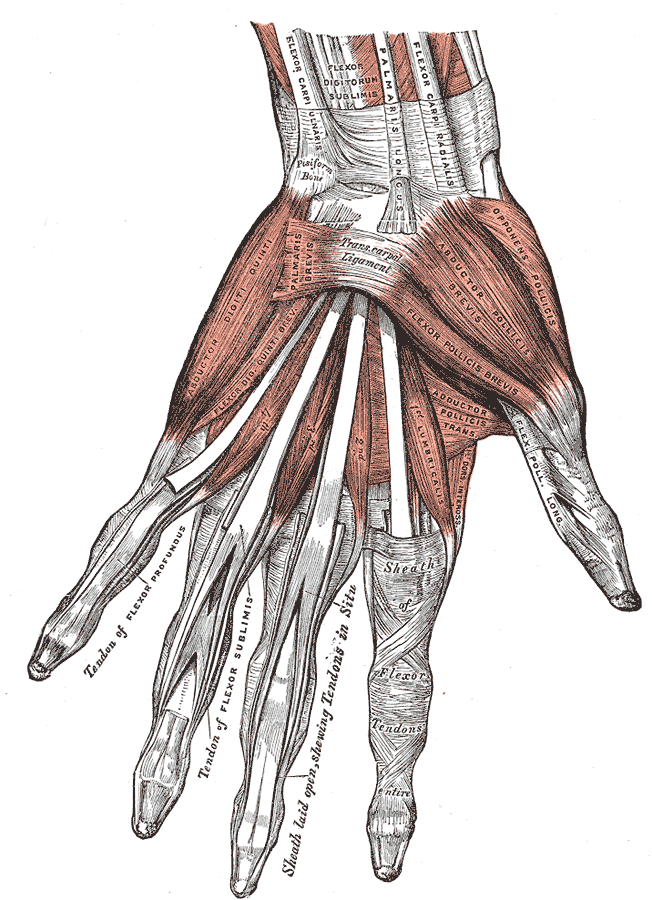
- The muscles of the left hand (palmar surface)

Details
- Origin: Hand and forearm
- Insertion: Thumb
- Artery: Ulnar and radial arteries
- Nerve: Median and ulnar nerve (C7-T1)
- Actions: Flexion, extension, adduction, abduction and oppossion of the thumb

The muscles of the thumb are nine skeletal muscles located in the hand and forearm. The muscles allow for flexion, extension, adduction, abduction and opposition of the thumb. The muscles acting on the thumb can be divided into two groups: The extrinsic hand muscles, with their muscle bellies located in the forearm, and the intrinsic hand muscles, with their muscles bellies located in the hand proper.

The muscles can be compared to guy-wires supporting a flagpole; tension from these muscular guy-wires must be provided in all directions to maintain stability in the articulated column formed by the bones of the thumb. Because this stability is actively maintained by muscles rather than by articular constraints, most muscles attached to the thumb tend to be active during most thumb motions.

== Extrinsic ==
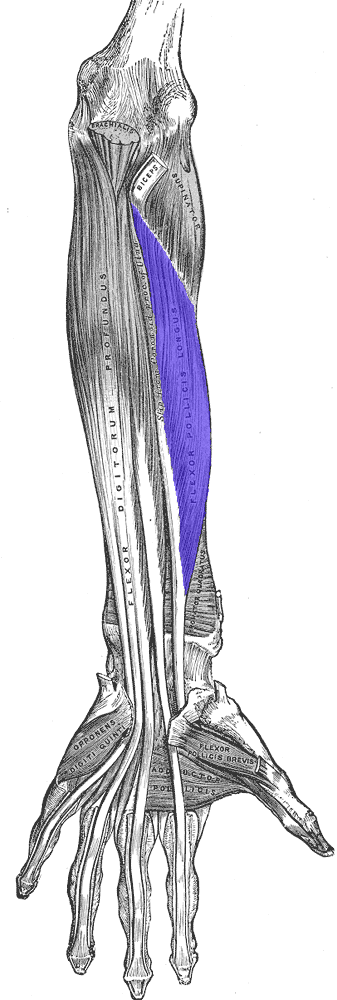
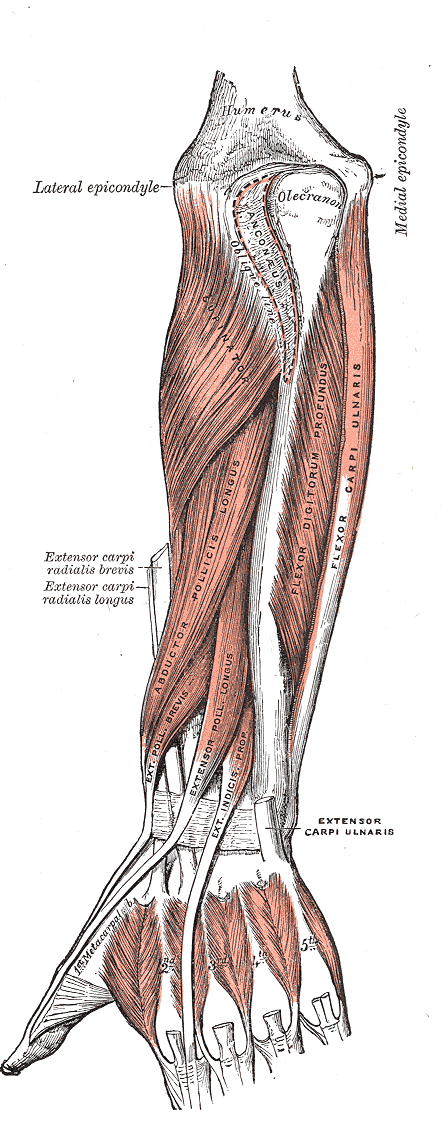
Flexor pollicis longus (left) and deep muscles of dorsal forearm (right)

A ventral forearm muscle, the flexor pollicis longus originates on the anterior side of the radius distal to the radial tuberosity and from the interosseous membrane. It passes through the carpal tunnel in a separate tendon sheath, after which it lies between the heads of the flexor pollicis brevis. It finally attaches onto the base of the distal phalanx of the thumb. It is innervated by the anterior interosseus branch of the median nerve (C7-C8)

Three dorsal forearm muscles act on the thumb:

The abductor pollicis longus originates on the dorsal sides of both the ulna and the radius, and from the interosseous membrane. Passing through the first tendon compartment, it inserts to the base of the first metacarpal bone. A part of the tendon reaches the trapezium, while another fuses with the tendons of the extensor pollicis brevis and the abductor pollicis brevis. Except for abducting the hand, it flexes the hand towards the palm and abducts it radially. It is innervated by the deep branch of the radial nerve (C7-C8).

The extensor pollicis longus originates on the dorsal side of the ulna and the interosseous membrane. Passing through the third tendon compartment, it is inserted onto the base of the distal phalanx of the thumb. It uses the dorsal tubercle on the lower extremity of the radius as a fulcrum to extend the thumb and also dorsiflexes and abducts the hand at the wrist. It is innervated by the deep branch of the radial nerve (C7-C8).

The extensor pollicis brevis originates on the ulna distal to the abductor pollicis longus, from the interosseus membrane, and from the dorsal side of the radius. Passing through the first tendon compartment together with the abductor pollicis longus, it is attached to the base of the proximal phalanx of the thumb. It extends the thumb and, because of its close relationship to the long abductor, also abducts the thumb. It is innervated by the deep branch of the radial nerve (C8-T1).

The tendons of the extensor pollicis longus and extensor pollicis brevis form what is known as the anatomical snuff box (an indentation on the lateral aspect of the thumb at its base) The radial artery can be palpated anteriorly at the wrist(not in the snuffbox).

== Intrinsic ==
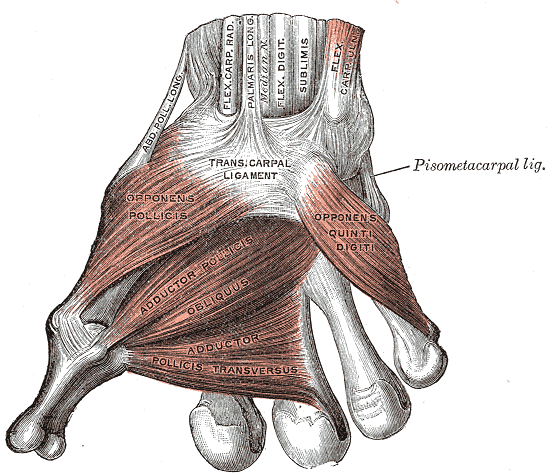
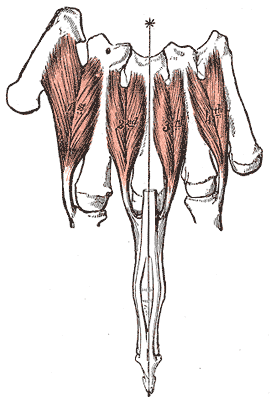
Thenar (left) and dorsal interossei (right) muscles

The intrinsic muscles of the thumb can be divided into two groups; the thenar eminence and other muscles. The thenar eminence refers to the group of muscles on the palm at the base of the thumb. The three muscles composing the thenar eminence are the abductor pollicis brevis, flexor pollicis brevis and opponens pollicis. The other two muscles that influences movement of the thumb are the adductor pollicis and the first dorsal interosseous muscle.

=== Thenar eminence ===
The most superficial muscle in the thenar group is the abductor pollicis brevis. The abductor brings the thumb away from the other four fingers. The flexor pollicis brevis, which lies next to the abductor, will flex the thumb, curling it up in the palm. The opponens pollicis lies deep to abductor pollicis brevis. As its name suggests, it opposes the thumb, bringing it against the fingers. This is a very important movement, as most of human hand dexterity including grip comes from this action.

The abductor pollicis brevis originates on the scaphoid tubercle and the flexor retinaculum. It inserts to the radial sesamoid bone and the proximal phalanx of the thumb. It is innervated by the median nerve (C8 and T1).

The flexor pollicis brevis is a two-headed muscle. The superficial head arises on the flexor retinaculum, while the deep head originates on three carpal bones: the trapezium, trapezoid, and capitate. The muscle is inserted onto the radial sesamoid bone of the metacarpophalangeal joint. It acts to flex, adduct, and abduct the thumb, and is therefore also able to oppose the thumb. The superficial head is innervated by the median nerve, while the deep head is innervated by the ulnar nerve (C8-T1). Due to a common interconnection between the median and ulnar nerves in the hand (Riche-Cannieu interconnection), the median nerve may innervate the flexor pollicis brevis in 35% of people. It is innervated by the ulnar nerve in 50% of people and by both the median and ulnar nerves in 15%.

The opponens pollicis originates on the tubercle of the trapezium and the flexor retinaculum. It is inserted onto the radial side of the first metacarpal. It opposes the thumb and assists in adduction. It is innervated by the median nerve. There are normal variations in the muscles nerve innervation. In a Cannieu-Riche anastomosis, fibers from the deep palmar branch of the ulnar nerve innervate the opponens pollicis and/or abductor pollicis brevis. Regardless of their final innervation, the nerves that reach the thenar muscles arise from the C8 and T1 roots, pass through the lower trunk of the plexus, and then through the medial cord of the plexus.

=== Other muscles ===
The adductor pollicis also has two heads. It lies deeper and more distal to flexor pollicis brevis. Despite its name, its main action is mainly rotation and opposition. The transversal head originates along the entire third metacarpal bone, while the oblique head originates on the carpal bones proximal to the third metacarpal. The muscle is inserted onto the ulnar sesamoid bone of the metacarpophalangeal joint. It adducts the thumb, and assists in opposition and flexion. It is innervated by the deep branch of the ulnar nerve (C8-T1).

The first dorsal interosseous, one of the central muscles of the hand, extends from the base of the thumb metacarpal to the radial side of the proximal phalanx of the index finger.

== Table ==
Muscle	Origin	Insertion	Inervation	Function
Abductor pollicis longus	Posterior side of ulna, radius and interosseous membrane	Base of first metacarpal	Radial nerve (C7-C8)	Abduction and extension of the MCP joint
Extensor pollicis brevis	Posterior side of radius and the interosseous membrane	Base of first proximal phalanx	Radial nerve (C7-C8)	Extension of MCP joint
Extensor pollicis longus	Middle third of posterior surface of ulna, interosseous membrane	Base of first distal phalanx	Deep branch of the radial nerve (C7-C8)	Extension of MCP and IP joints
Flexor pollicis longus	The middle 2/4 of the volar surface of the radius and the adjacent interosseus membrane	Base of first distal phalanx	Anterior interosseus branch of the median nerve (C8-T1)	Flexion of MCP and IP joints
Abductor pollicis brevis	Transverse carpal ligament, the scaphoid and trapezium	Radial base of proximal phalanx and the radial sesamoid	Median nerve (C8-T1)	Abduction of MCP joint and flexion of IP joint. It also assists in opposition and extension of the thumb
Adductor pollicis	Transverse head: anterior body of the third metacarpal Oblique head: bases of the second and the third metacarpals and the adjacent trapezoid and capitate bones	Medial side of the base of the proximal phalanx of the thumb and the ulnar sesamoid	Ulnar nerve (C8-T1)	Adducts at the CMC joint and opposition
First dorsal interosseous	Medial side of first metacarpal bone	Lateral side of second proximal phalanx	Ulnar nerve (C8-T1)	
Flexor pollicis brevis	Trapezium, flexor retinaculum	Base of proximal phalanx and the radial sesamoid	Median nerve (C8-T1)	Flexion at the MCP joint
Opponens pollicis	Trapezium and flexor retinaculum	Radial side of the corpus of the first metacarpal bone	Median nerve (C8-T1)	Opposition and adduction

== See also ==
- Anatomical terms of location
- Anatomical terms of motion

== Additional images ==
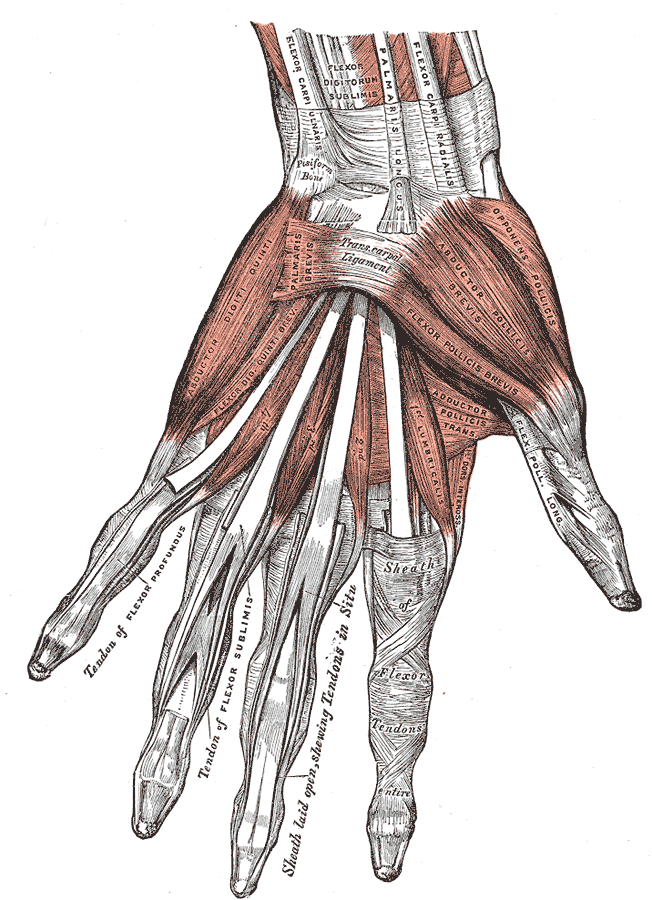
The muscles of the left hand. Palmar surface.

== Sources ==
- Austin, Noelle M. (2005). "Chapter 9: The Wrist and Hand Complex". In Levangie, Pamela K.; Norkin, Cynthia C. (eds.). Joint Structure and Function: A Comprehensive Analysis (4th ed.). Philadelphia: F. A. Davis Company. ISBN 978-0-8036-1191-7.
- Platzer, Werner (2004). Color Atlas of Human Anatomy, Vol. 1: Locomotor System (5th ed.). Thieme. ISBN 3-13-533305-1.
