= Carpal ligament =

Carpal ligament may refer to:

- Palmar carpal ligament
- Ulnar carpal collateral ligament
- Radial carpal collateral ligament
- Radiate carpal ligament
- Extensor retinaculum of the hand, also known as dorsal carpal ligament
- Flexor retinaculum of the hand, also known as transverse carpal ligament
