= Flexor carpi ulnaris muscle =

Muscle of the forearm

Flexor carpi ulnaris
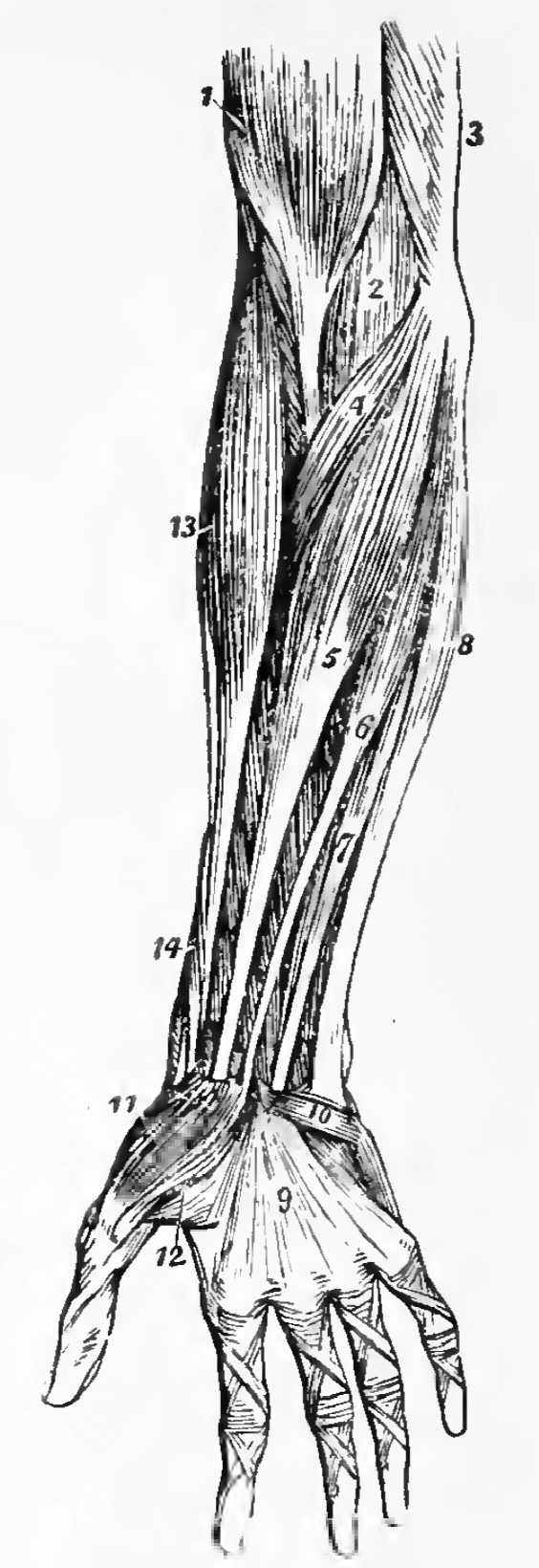
- The superficial layer of muscles of the anterior aspect of right forearm. The flexor carpi ulnaris muscle is labeled 8. (From Quain's Anatomy.)

Details
- Origin: Medial epicondyle (common flexor tendon) and medial margin on olecranon of ulna
- Insertion: Pisiform, hook of the hamate, base of the fifth metacarpal bone (volar aspect)
- Artery: Ulnar artery
- Nerve: Muscular branches of ulnar nerve (from C8 and T1)
- Actions: Flexion and adduction of wrist
- Antagonist: Extensor carpi radialis brevis muscle and extensor carpi radialis longus muscle

Identifiers
- Latin: musculus flexor carpi ulnaris
- TA98: A04.6.02.030
- TA2: 2483
- FMA: 38465

The flexor carpi ulnaris (FCU) is a muscle of the forearm that flexes and adducts at the wrist joint.

== Structure ==
=== Origin ===
The flexor carpi ulnaris has two heads; a humeral head and ulnar head. The humeral head originates from the medial epicondyle of the humerus via the common flexor tendon. The ulnar head originates from the medial margin of the olecranon of the ulna and the upper two-thirds of the dorsal border of the ulna by an aponeurosis. Between the two heads passes the ulnar nerve and ulnar artery.

=== Insertion ===
The flexor carpi ulnaris inserts onto the pisiform, hook of the hamate (via the pisohamate ligament) and the anterior surface of the base of the fifth metacarpal (via the pisometacarpal ligament).

=== Action ===
The flexor carpi ulnaris flexes and adducts at the wrist joint.

=== Innervation ===
The flexor carpi ulnaris is innervated by the ulnar nerve. The corresponding spinal nerves are C8 and T1.

=== Tendon ===
The tendon of flexor carpi ulnaris can be seen on the anterior surface of the distal forearm. On a person's distal forearm, just before the wrist, there are typically three tendons. The tendon of the flexor carpi ulnaris is the most medial (closest to the little finger) of these. The most lateral one is the tendon of flexor carpi radialis muscle, and the middle one is the tendon of palmaris longus (the most prominent one, according to Gray's Anatomy).

== Function ==
The muscle, like all flexors of the forearm, can be strengthened by exercises that resist its flexion. A wrist roller can be used and wrist curls with dumbbells can also be performed. These exercises are used to prevent injury to the ulnar collateral ligament of elbow joint.

== Variability ==
The muscle can be doubled as accessory flexor carpi ulnaris muscle and is often accompanied by concomitant variants.

== Clinical significance ==
Ulnar entrapment by the aponeurosis of the two heads of the flexor carpi ulnaris muscle may cause cubital tunnel syndrome.

The tendon of flexor carpi ulnaris can be used for tendon transfer.

== Additional images ==
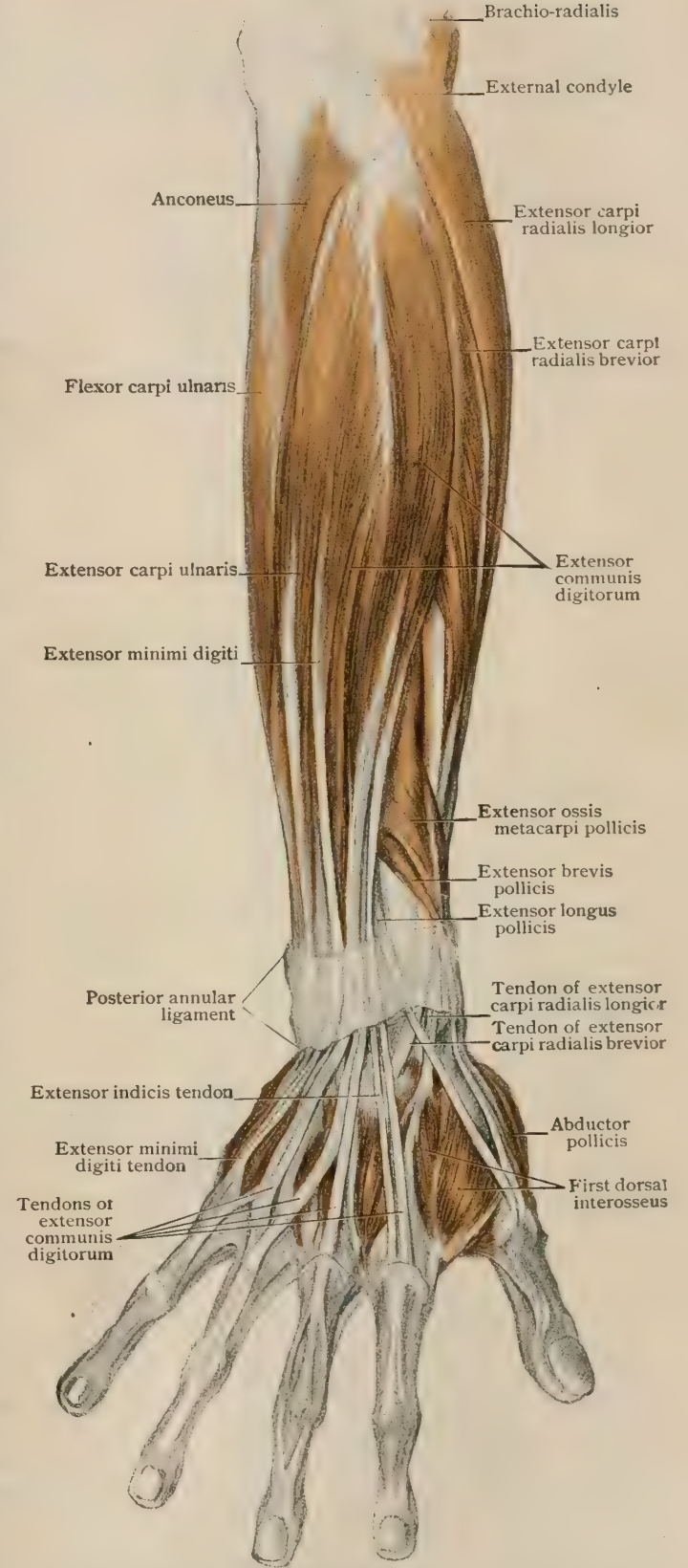
Dissection of posterior aspect of right-sided forearm and hand, showing superficial extensor muscles. The flexor carpi ulnaris is labeled. (After Piersol.)

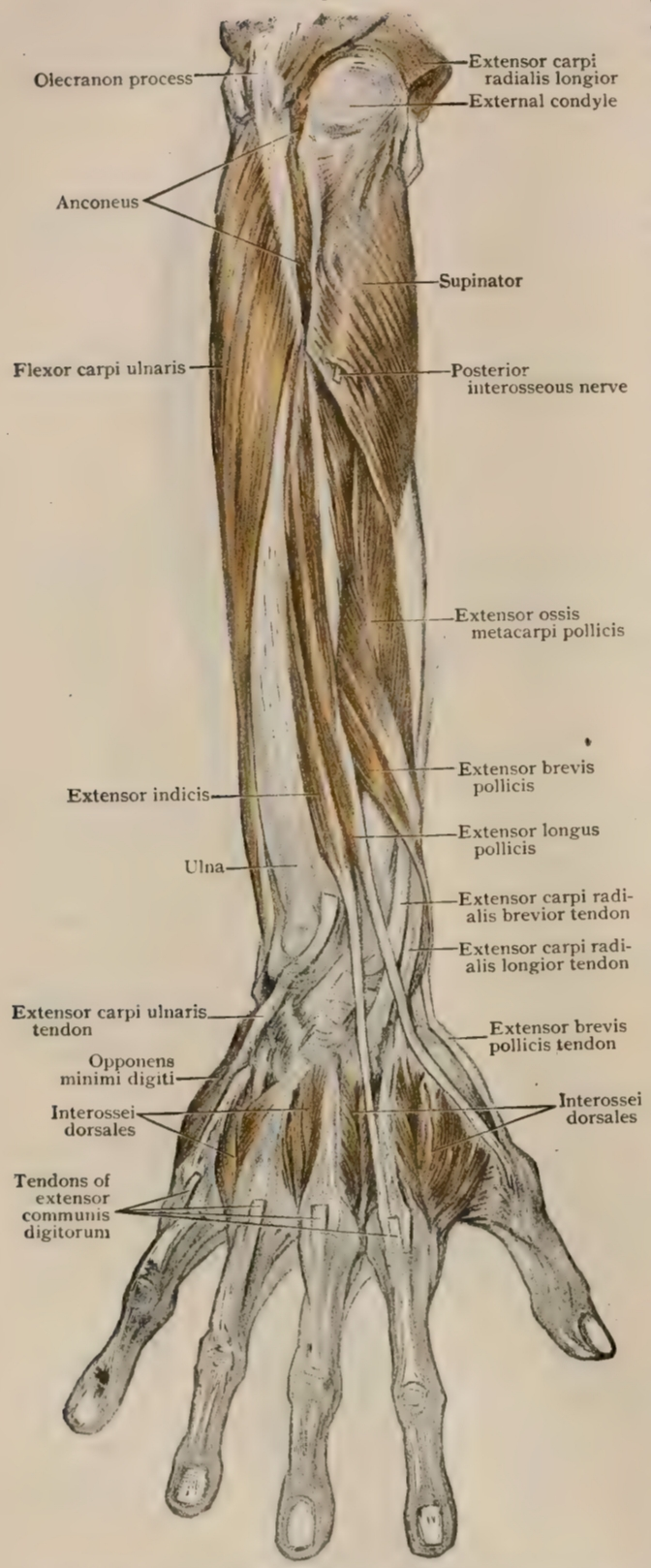
Dissection of posterior aspect of right-sided forearm and hand, depicting deep muscles. The flexor carpi ulnaris finds itself labeled. (From Piersol's Anatomy.)

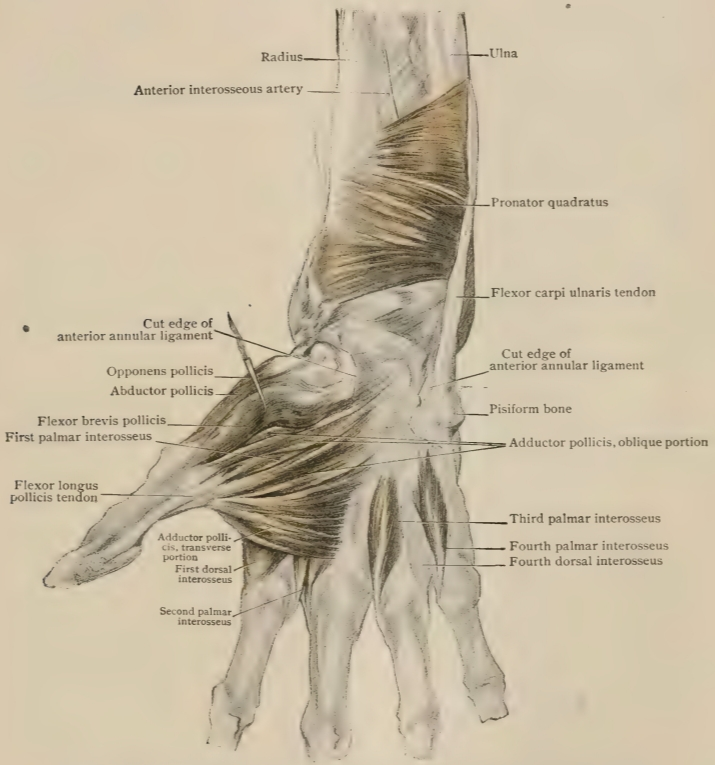
Dissection of right-sided forearm and hand, showing the flexor carpi ulnaris tendon and surrounding anatomy. Anterior view. (After Piersol.)

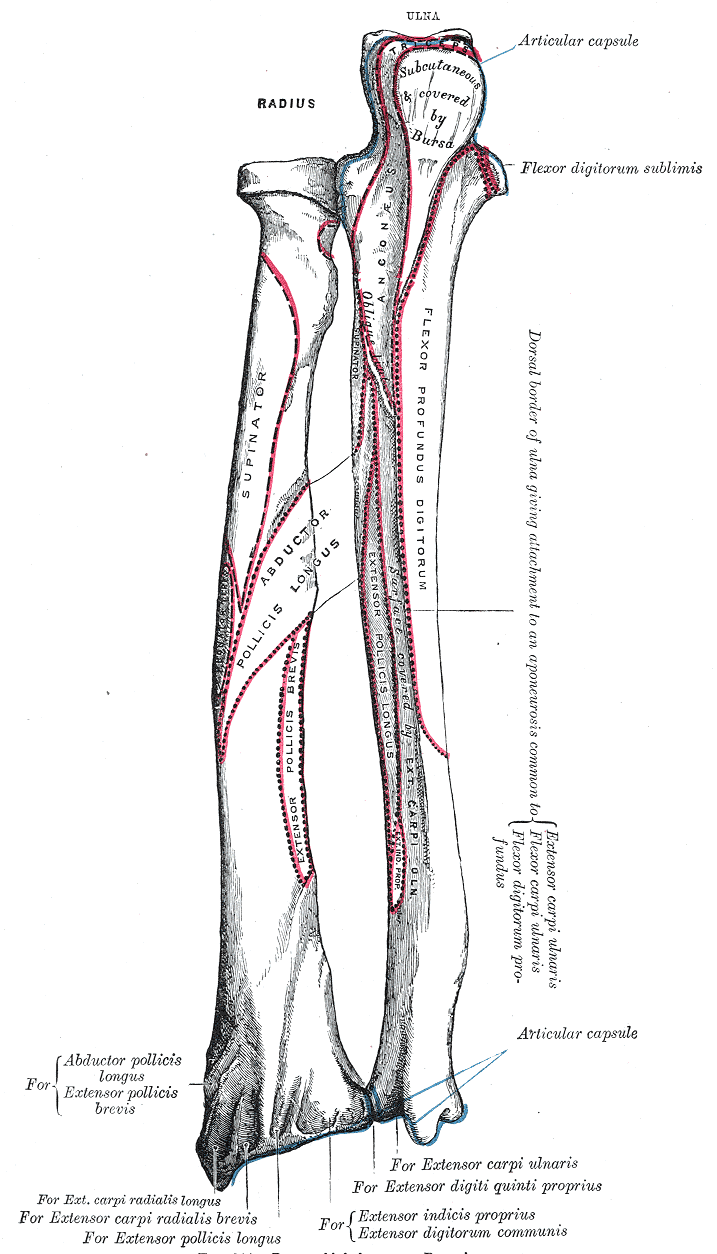
Bones of left forearm. Posterior aspect.

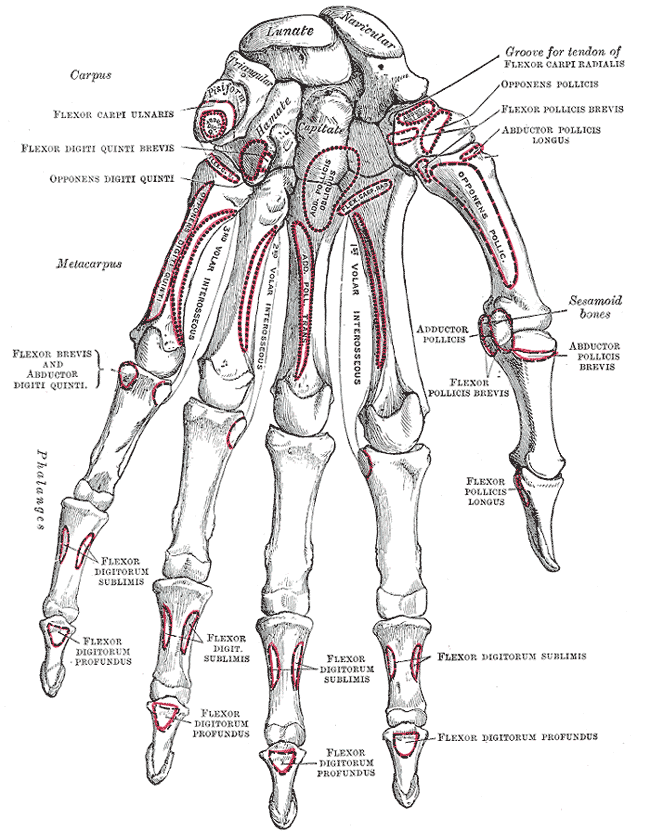
Bones of the left hand. Volar surface showing its insertion into the pisiform bone and then via ligaments into the hamate bone and 5th metacarpal bone, acting to flex and adduct the wrist joint.

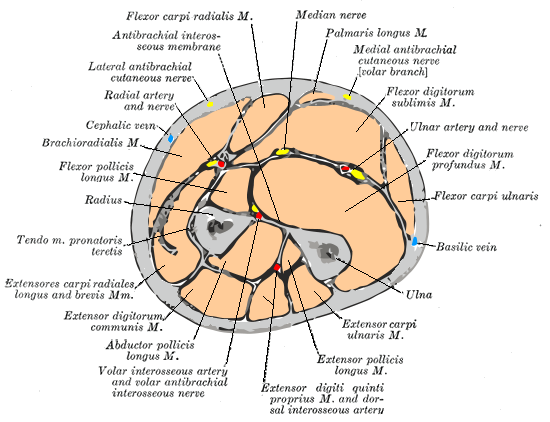
Cross-section through the middle of the forearm.

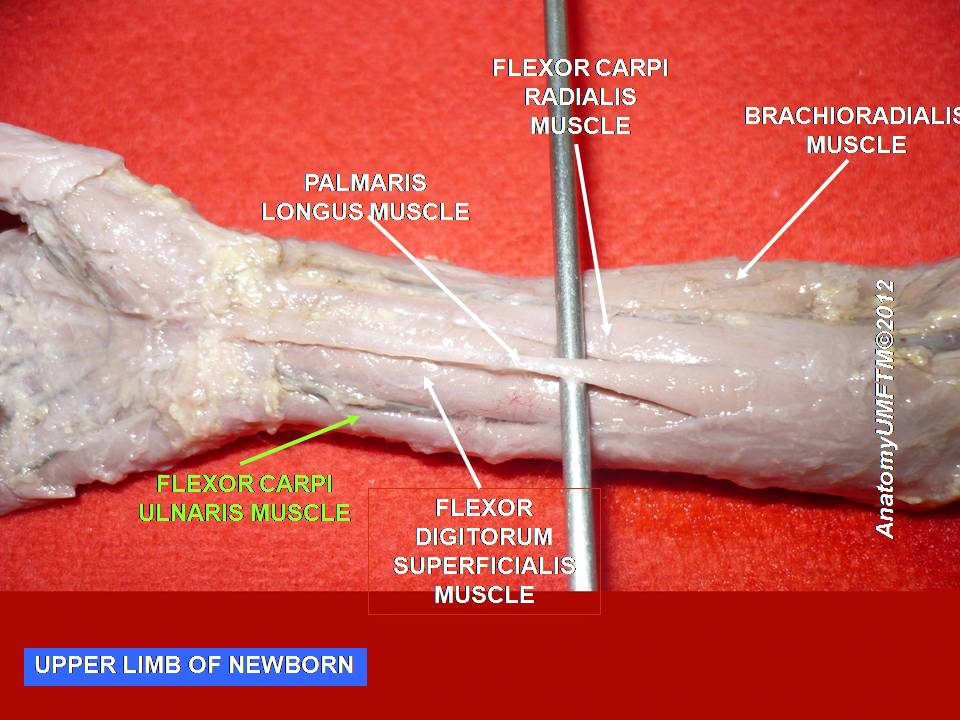
Cadaveric flexor carpi ulnaris of the right upper limb.
