= Brachioradialis =

Muscle of the upper limb

Brachioradialis muscle
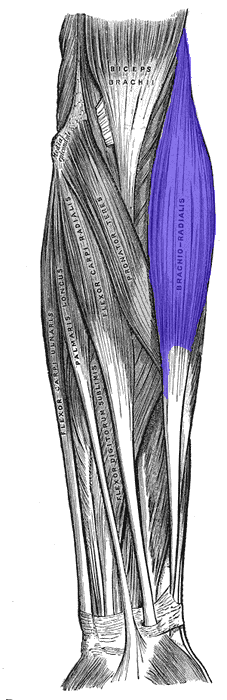
- Anterior view of muscles of the left forearm with brachioradialis shown in blue

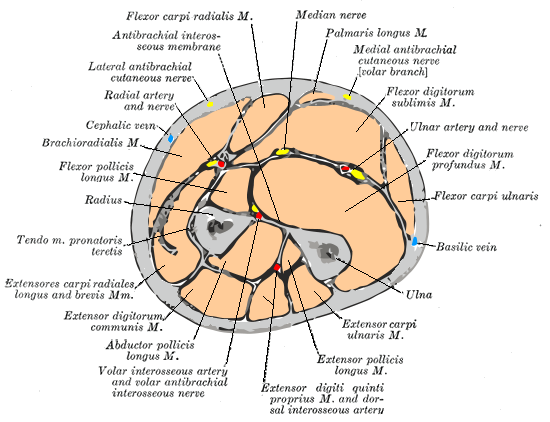
- Cross-section through the middle of the forearm. Brachioradialis labeled at center left, sixth from the top.

Details
- Origin: Lateral supracondylar ridge of the humerus and the orbicular ligament of the radius
- Insertion: Distal radius (radial styloid process)
- Artery: Radial recurrent artery
- Nerve: Radial nerve (C5–C8 & T1)
- Actions: Flexion of elbow, supination and pronation of the radioulnar joint to 90°

Identifiers
- Latin: musculus brachioradialis
- TA98: A04.6.02.039
- TA2: 2496
- FMA: 38485

The brachioradialis, also historically known as the supinator longus, is a muscle of the forearm that flexes the forearm at the elbow. It is also capable of both pronation and supination, depending on the position of the forearm. It is attached to the distal styloid process of the radius by way of the brachioradialis tendon, and to the lateral supracondylar ridge of the humerus.

== Structure ==
The brachioradialis is a superficial, fusiform muscle on the lateral side of the forearm. It originates proximally on the lateral supracondylar ridge of the humerus. It inserts distally on the radius, at the base of its styloid process. Near the elbow, it forms the lateral limit of the cubital fossa, or elbow pit.

=== Nerve supply ===
Despite the bulk of the muscle body being visible from the anterior aspect of the forearm, the brachioradialis is a posterior compartment muscle and consequently is innervated by the radial nerve. Of the muscles that receive innervation from the radial nerve, it is one of only four that receive input directly from the radial nerve. The other three are the triceps, anconeus, and extensor carpi radialis longus. (All other posterior compartment muscles that receive radial innervation are supplied by the deep branch of the radial nerve.)

== Function ==
The brachioradialis flexes the forearm at the elbow. When the forearm is pronated, the brachioradialis tends to supinate as it flexes. In a supinated position, it tends to pronate as it flexes. This also assists the biceps brachii.

The brachioradialis is a stronger elbow flexor when the forearm is in a midposition between supination and pronation at the radioulnar joint. When pronated, the brachioradialis is more active during elbow flexion since the biceps brachii is in a mechanical disadvantage.

With the insertion of the muscle so far from the fulcrum of the elbow, the brachioradialis does not generate as much joint torque as the brachialis or the biceps. It is effective mainly when those muscles have already partially flexed at the elbow. The brachioradialis flexes the forearm at the elbow, especially when quick movement is required and when a weight is lifted during slow flexion of the forearm.

The muscle is used to stabilize the elbow during rapid flexion and extension while in a midposition, such as in hammering. The brachioradialis is synergistic with the brachialis and biceps brachii; the triceps brachii and anconeus are antagonistic.

== Additional images ==
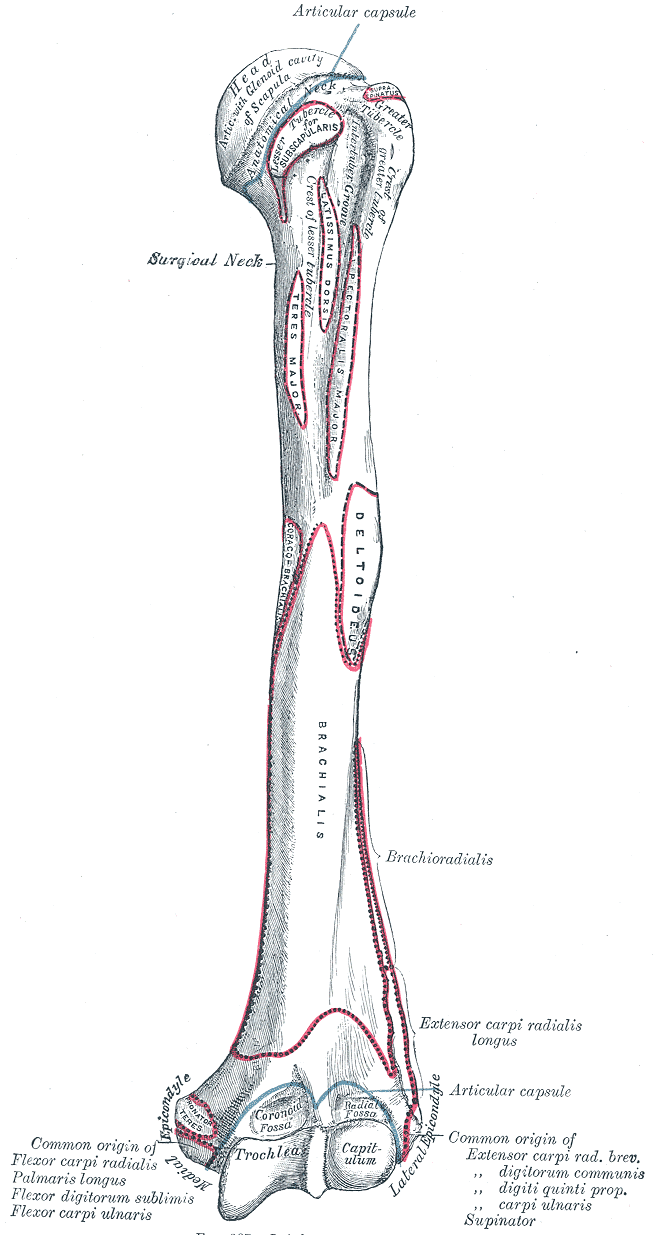
Left humerus. Anterior view.

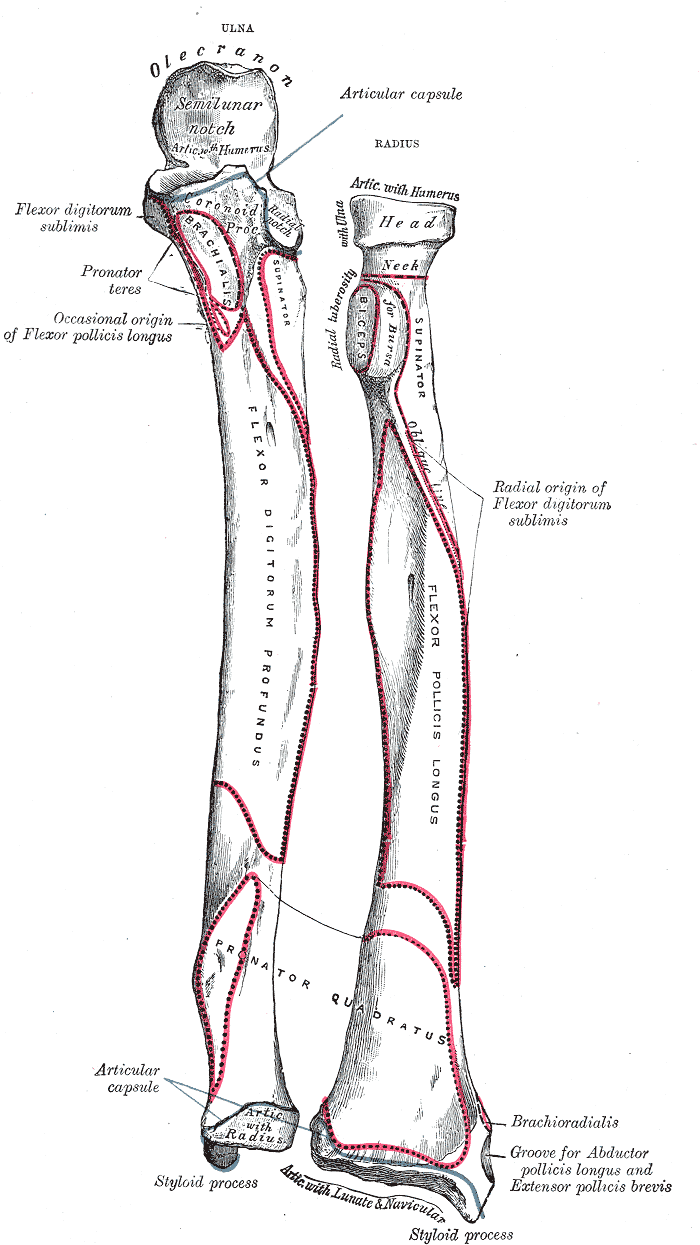
Bones of left forearm. Anterior aspect.

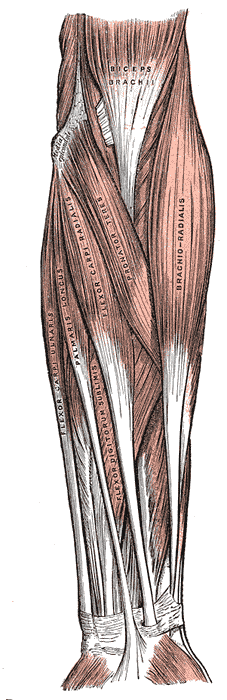
Front of the left forearm. Superficial muscles.

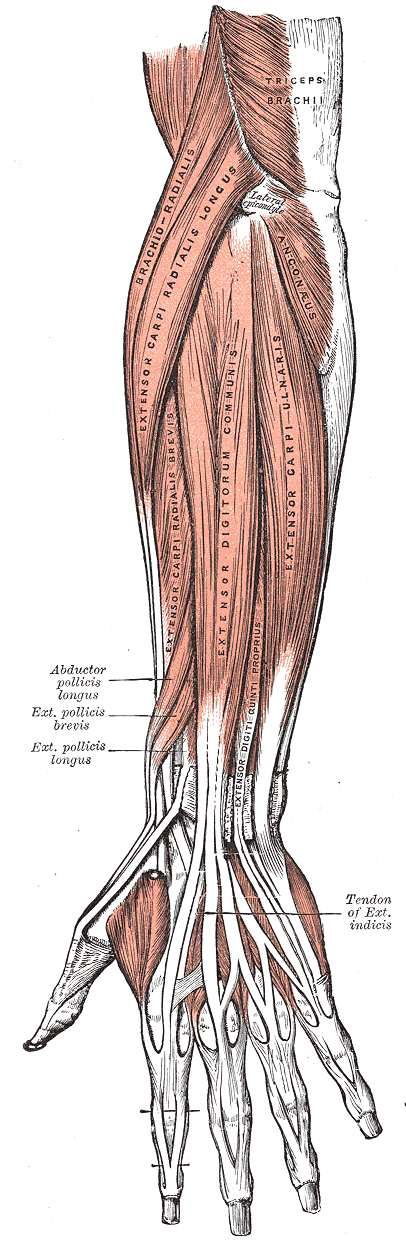
Posterior surface of the left forearm. Superficial muscles.

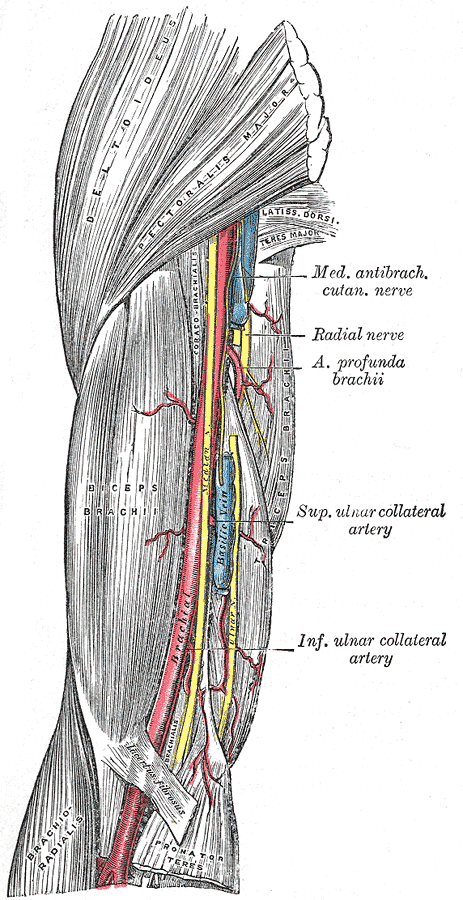
The brachial artery (right upper limb).

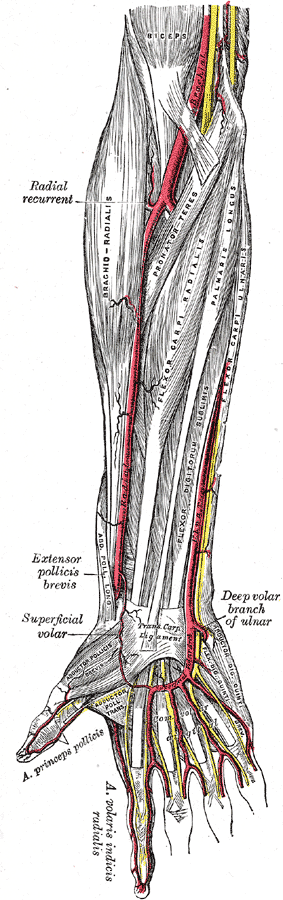
Radial and ulnar arteries of the right upper limb. Anterior aspect. Superficial view.

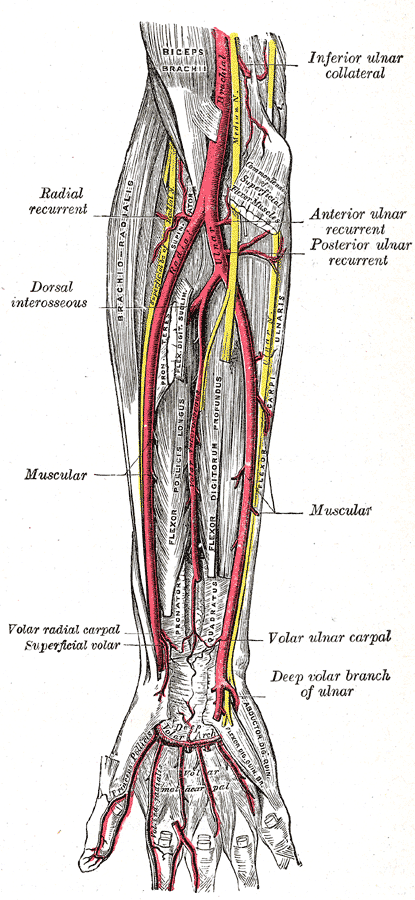
Radial and ulnar arteries of the right upper limb. Anterior aspect. Deep view.

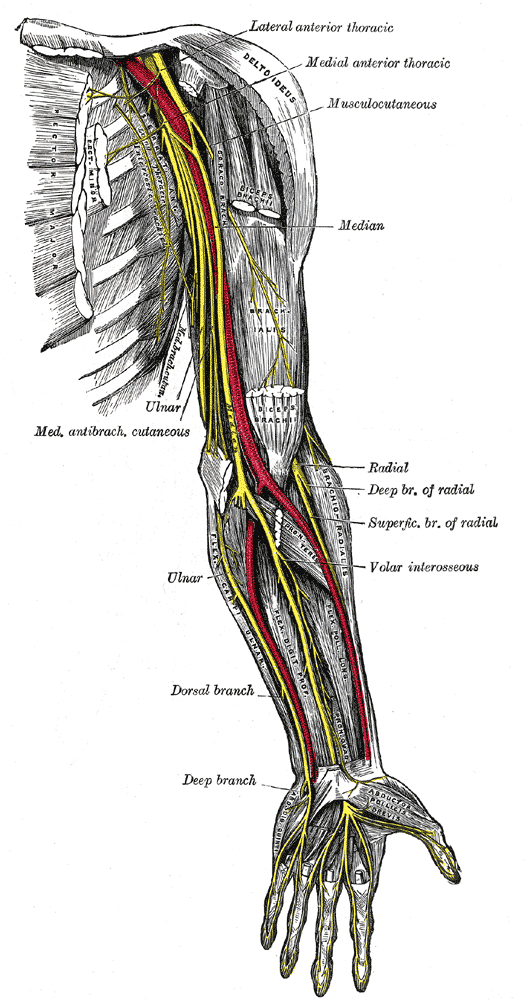
Nerves of the left upper extremity.

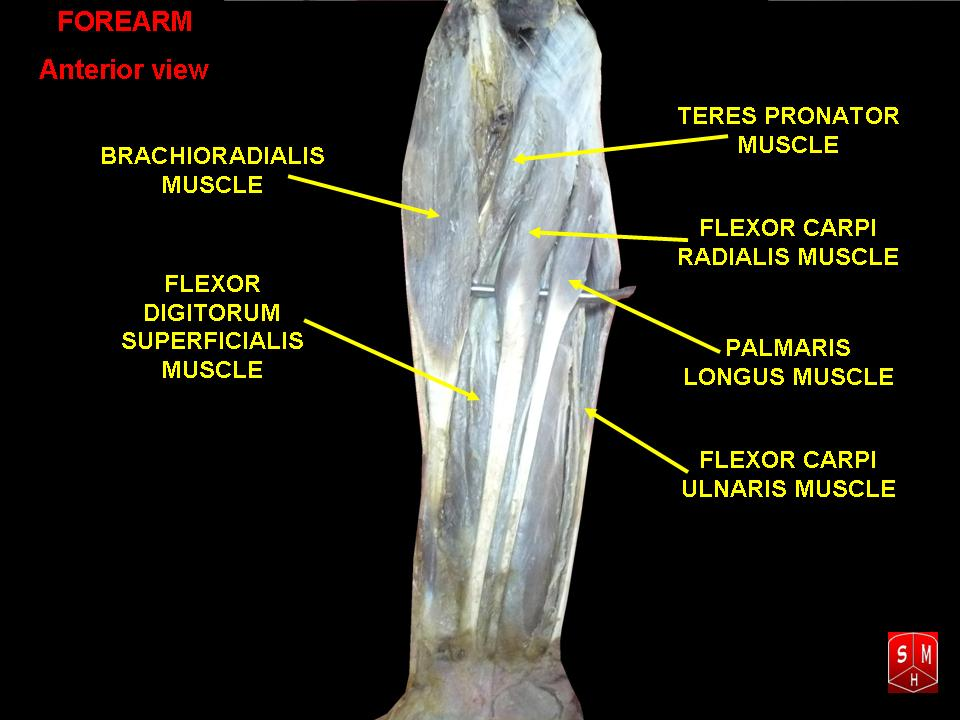
Cadaveric brachioradialis of the right upper limb.

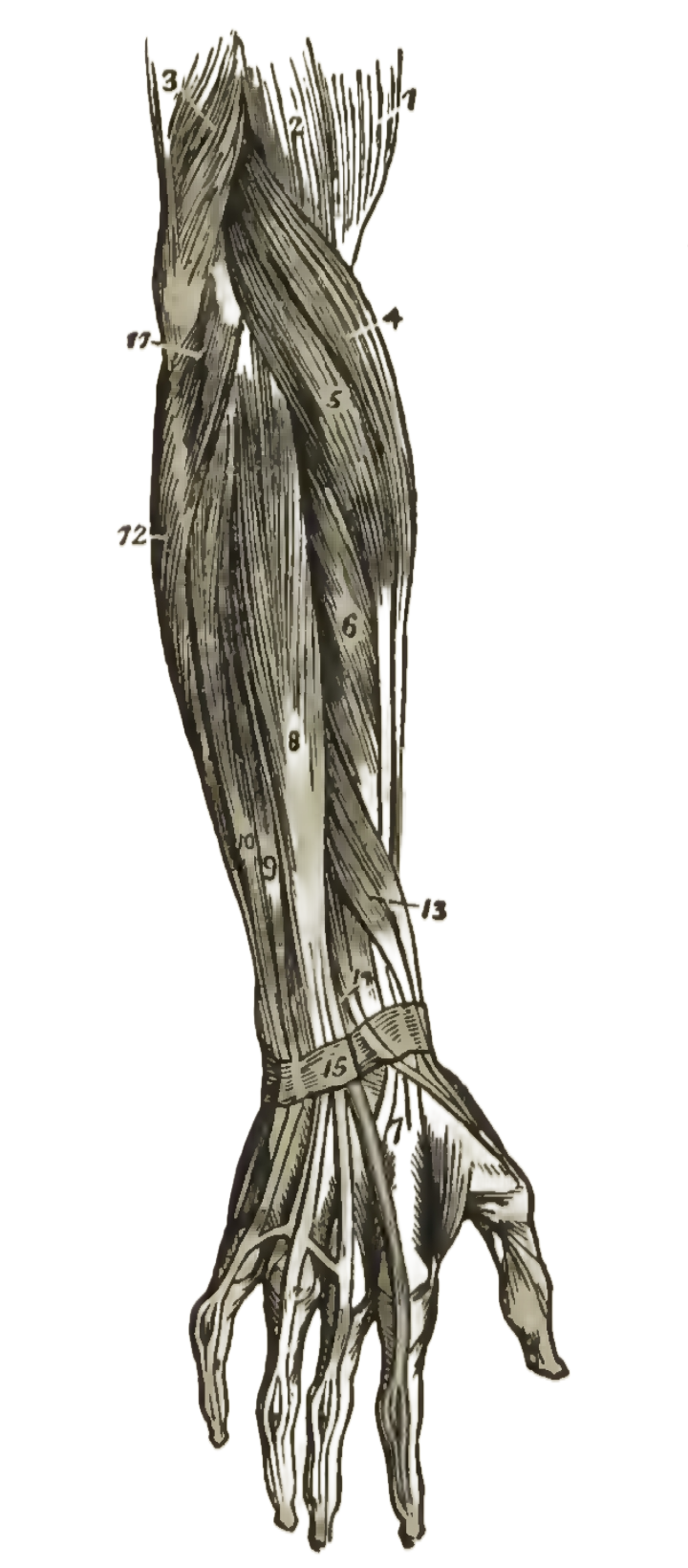
The superficial muscular layer of the posterior aspect of the right forearm. The brachioradialis is labelled 4. (From Quain's Anatomy.)

== See also ==
Supinator (also historically known as "supinator brevis").
