= Extensor carpi muscle =

Extensor carpi muscle may refer to:

- Extensor carpi radialis brevis muscle
- Extensor carpi radialis longus muscle
- Extensor carpi ulnaris muscle
