= Cervical spinal nerve 8 =

Spinal nerve of the cervical segment

Cervical spinal nerve
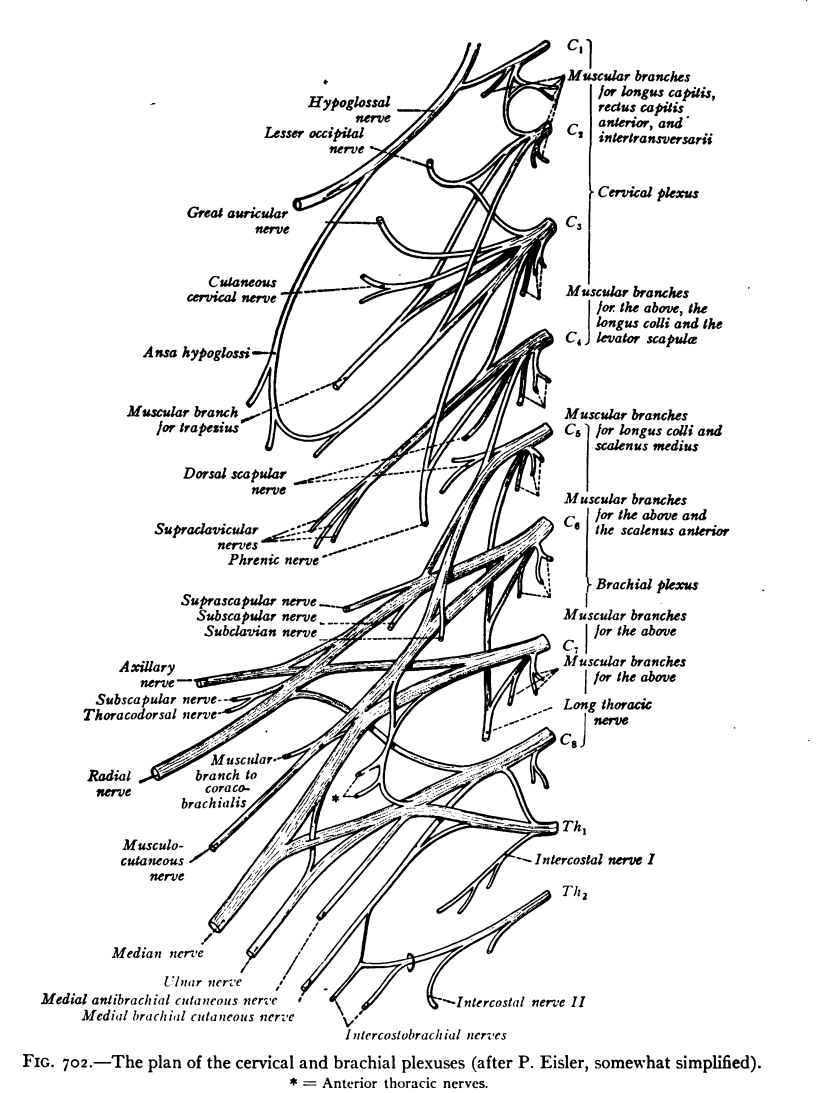
- The plan of the cervical and brachial plexuses.

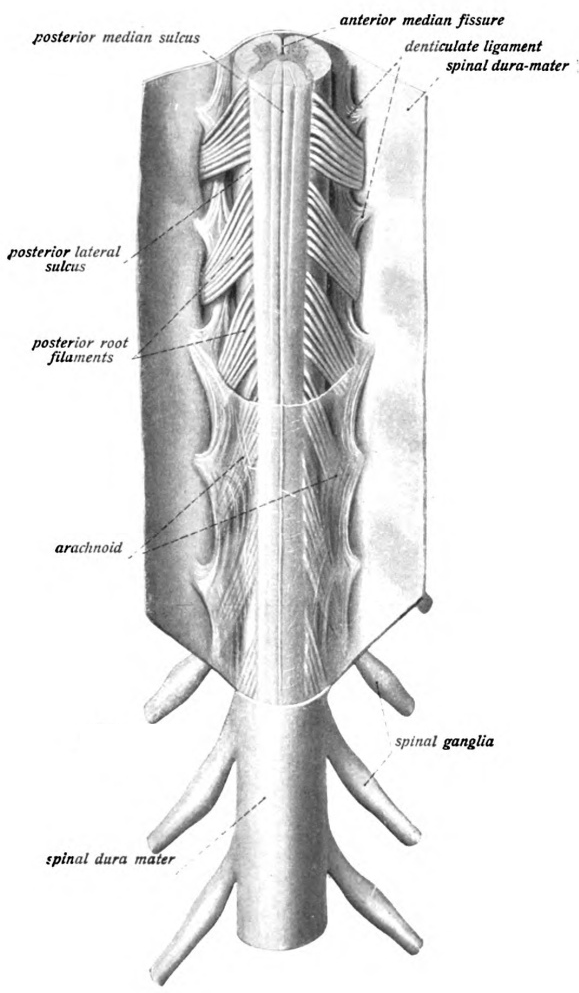
- The spinal cord with spinal nerves.

Details

Identifiers
- Latin: nervi spinalis
- FMA: 6449

The cervical spinal nerve 8 (C8) is a spinal nerve of the cervical segment.

It originates from the spinal column from below the cervical vertebra 7 (C7).

== Innervation ==
The C8 nerve forms part of the radial and ulnar nerves via the brachial plexus, and therefore has motor and sensory function in the upper limb.

=== Sensory ===
The C8 nerve receives sensory afferents from the C8 dermatome. This consists of all the skin on the little finger, and continuing up slightly past the wrist on the palmar and dorsal aspects of the hand and forearm. Clinically, a test of the pad of the little finger is often used to assess C8 integrity.

=== Motor ===
The C8 nerve contributes to the motor innervation of many of the muscles in the trunk and upper limb. Its primary function is the flexion of the fingers, and this is used as the clinical test for C8 integrity, in conjunction with the finger jerk reflex.

The particular muscles receive innervation from C8 (shown by specific nerve and spinal nerve segments; muscles in italics only have a minor contribution from C8) :

==== Trunk ====
- Pectoralis major - Medial and lateral pectoral nerves (C5, C6, C7, C8, T1)
- Pectoralis minor - Medial pectoral nerve (C5, C6, C7, C8, T1)
- Latissimus dorsi - Thoracodorsal nerve (C6, C7, C8)

==== Upper arm ====
- Triceps brachii - Radial nerve (C6, C7, C8)

==== Forearm ====
- Flexor carpi ulnaris - Ulnar nerve (C7, C8, T1)
- Palmaris longus - Median nerve (C7, C8)
- Flexor digitorum superficialis - Median nerve (C8, T1)
- Flexor digitorum profundus - Median and Ulnar nerves (C8, T1)
- Flexor pollicis longus - Median nerve (C7, C8)
- Pronator quadratus - Median nerve (C7, C8)
- Extensor carpi radialis brevis - Deep branch of the radial nerve (C7, C8)
- Extensor digitorum - Posterior interosseous nerve (C7, C8)
- Extensor digiti minimi - Posterior interosseous nerve (C7, C8)
- Extensor carpi ulnaris - Posterior interosseous nerve (C7, C8)
- Anconeus - Radial nerve (C6, C7, C8)
- Abductor pollicis longus - Posterior interosseous nerve (C7, C8)
- Extensor pollicis brevis - Posterior interosseous nerve (C7, C8)
- Extensor pollicis longus - Posterior interosseous nerve (C7, C8)
- Extensor indicis - Posterior interosseous nerve (C7, C8)

==== Hand ====
- Palmaris brevis - Superficial branch of ulnar nerve (C8, T1)
- Dorsal interossei - Deep branch of ulnar nerve (C8, T1)
- Palmar interossei - Deep branch of ulnar nerve (C8, T1)
- Adductor pollicis - Deep branch of ulnar nerve (C8, T1)
- Lumbricals - Deep branch of ulnar nerve, Digital branches of median nerve
- Opponens pollicis - Recurrent branch of median nerve (C8, T1)
- Abductor pollicis brevis - Recurrent branch of median nerve (C8, T1)
- Flexor pollicis brevis - Recurrent branch of median nerve (C8, T1)
- Opponens digiti minimi - Deep branch of ulnar nerve (C8, T1)
- Abductor digiti minimi - Deep branch of ulnar nerve (C8, T1)
- Flexor digiti minimi brevis - Deep branch of ulnar nerve (C8, T1)

== Additional images ==
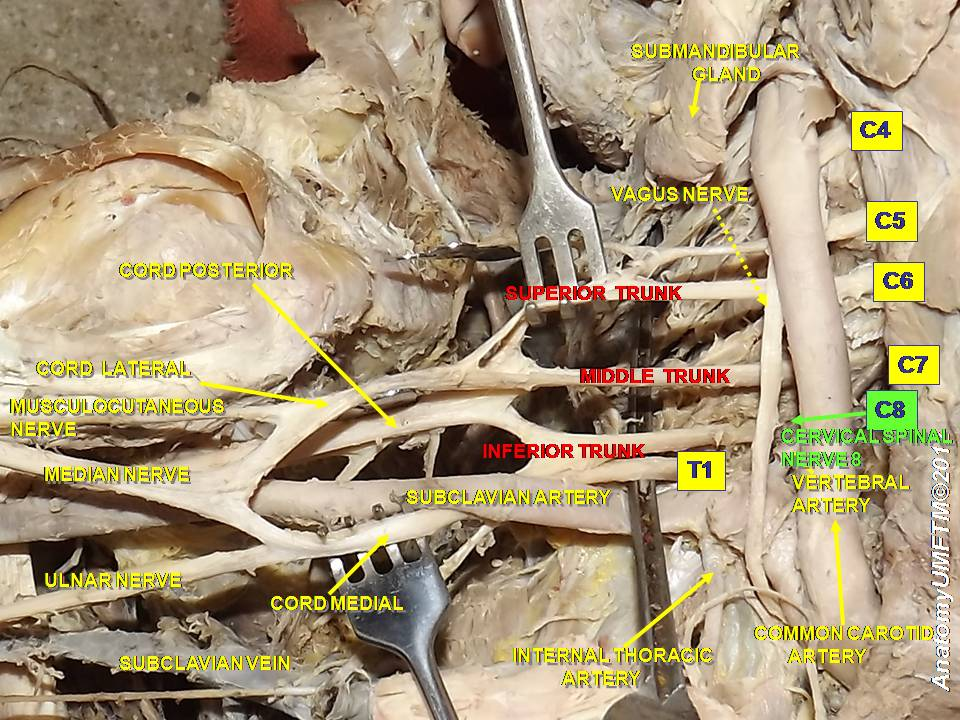
Cervical spinal nerve 8
