= ECRL =

ECRL may refer to:

- MRL East Coast Rail Link, under construction in Malaysia
- Epping to Chatswood rail link, a railway line in Sydney, Australia
- Extensor carpi radialis longus, a wrist muscle
