= Common flexor tendon =

Tendon of the forearm

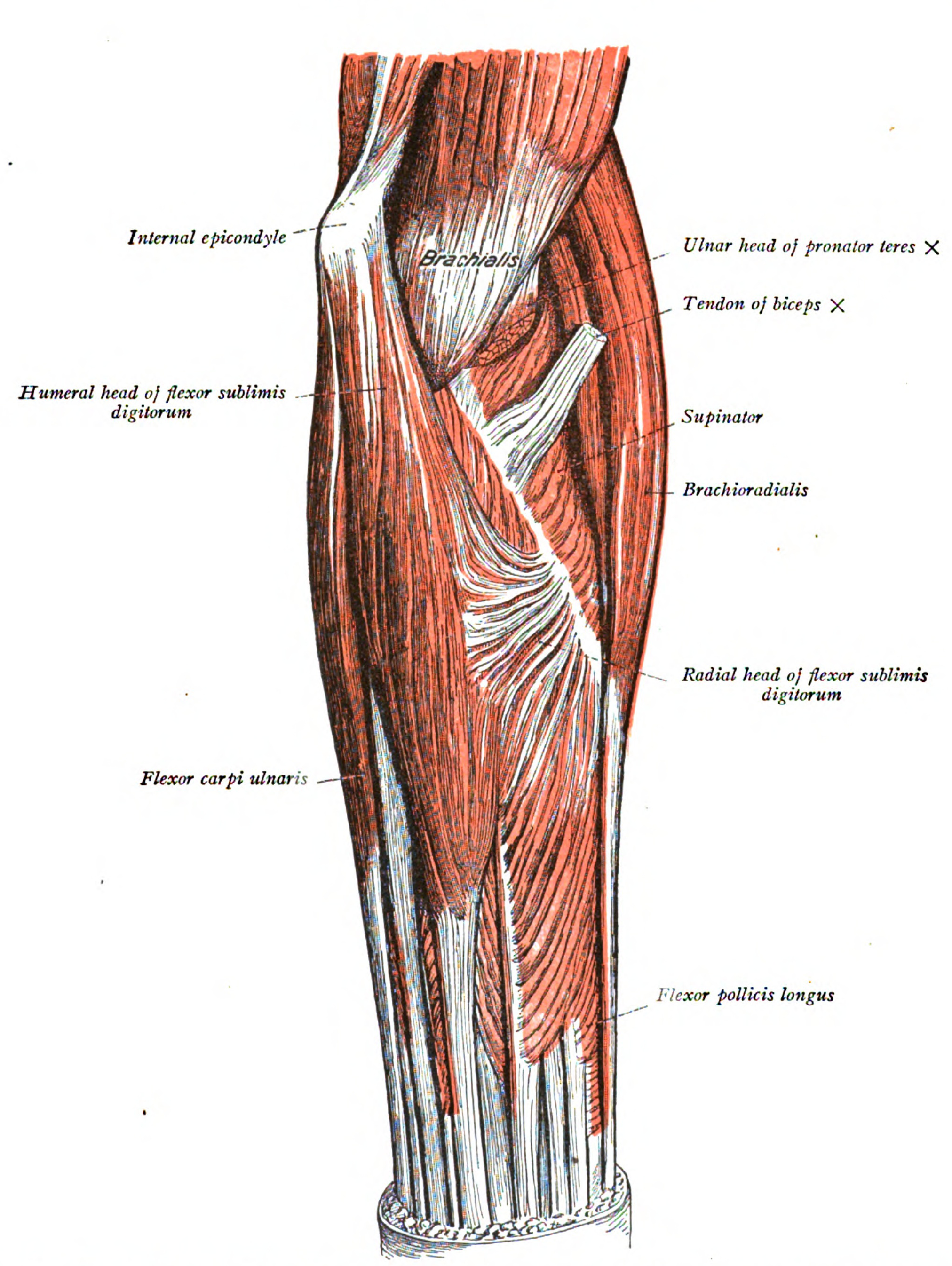
- Frontal view of the muscles of the human forearm (Suarez, C.A. and Vilensky, J., All-in-One Anatomy Exam Review. Vol. 1 Back and Upper Limb).

Identifiers
- TA2: 2489
- FMA: 63259

The common flexor tendon is a tendon that attaches to the medial epicondyle of the humerus (lower part of the bone of the upper arm that is near the elbow joint).

It serves as the upper attachment point for all five superficial muscles of the front of the forearm:

- Flexor carpi ulnaris
- Palmaris longus
- Flexor carpi radialis
- Pronator teres (humeral head)
- Flexor digitorum superficialis

The said muscles make up what is known as the "flexor-pronator mass".

== See also ==
- Common extensor tendon
