= Lateral supracondylar ridge =

Lower part of the lateral border of the body of the humerus

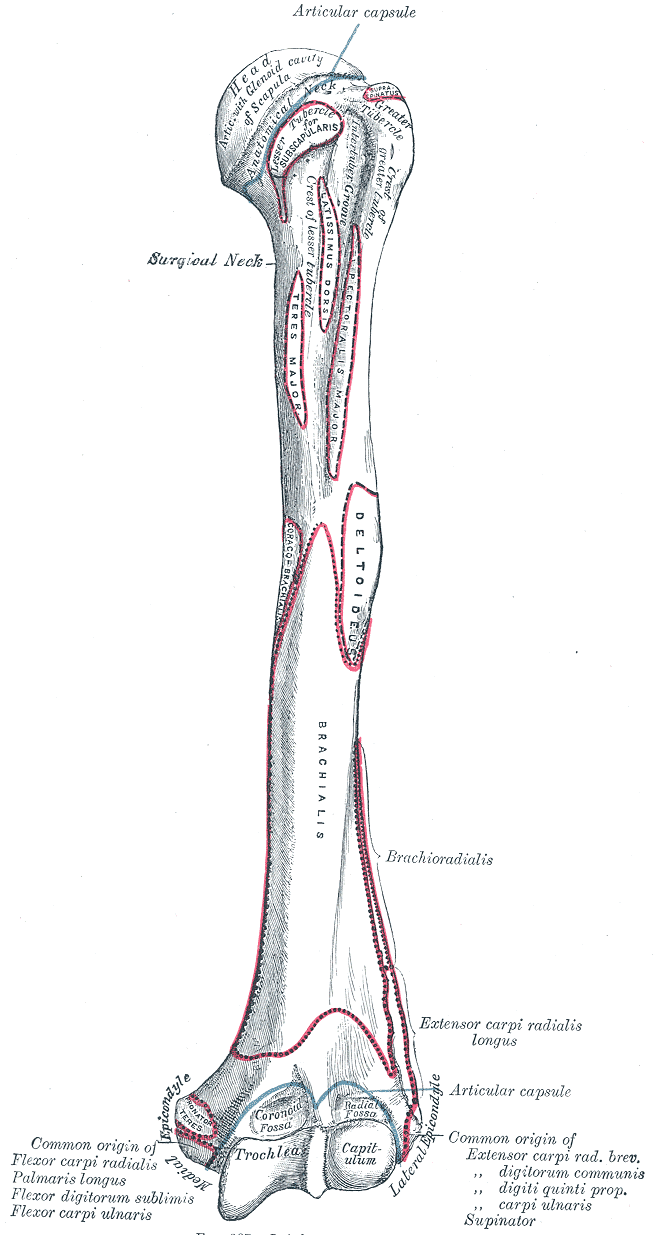
- Left humerus. Anterior view. (Lateral supracondylar ridge on side at bottom right, but not labeled.)

Details

Identifiers
- Latin: crista supracondylaris lateralis
- TA98: A02.4.04.019
- TA2: 1195
- FMA: 75078

The lateral supracondylar ridge is a prominent, rough margin on the lower part of the lateral border of the humerus. It presents an anterior lip for the origin of forearm extensors, including the brachioradialis muscle above, and the extensor carpi radialis longus muscle below. It also presents a posterior lip for the triceps brachii, and an intermediate ridge for the attachment of the lateral intermuscular septum.

== Clinical significance ==
The lateral supracondylar ridge may be broken in a supracondylar humerus fracture, common in children.
