= Antebrachial fascia =

Connective tissue over lower arm muscles

Details

Identifiers
- Latin: fascia antebrachii
- TA98: A04.6.03.008
- TA2: 2544
- FMA: 38851

The antebrachial fascia (antibrachial fascia or deep fascia of forearm) continuous above with the brachial fascia (deep fascia of the arm), is a dense, membranous investment, which forms a general sheath for the muscles in this region; it is attached, behind, to the olecranon and dorsal border of the ulna, and gives off from its deep surface numerous intermuscular septa, which enclose each muscle separately.

Over the flexor muscles tendons as they approach the wrist it is especially thickened, and forms the volar carpal ligament.

This is continuous with the transverse carpal ligament, and forms a sheath for the tendon of the palmaris longus which passes over the transverse carpal ligament to be inserted into the palmar aponeurosis.

Behind, near the wrist-joint, it is thickened by the addition of many transverse fibers, and forms the dorsal carpal ligament.

It is much thicker on the dorsal than on the volar surface, and at the lower than at the upper part of the forearm, and is strengthened above by tendinous fibers derived from the biceps brachii in front, and from the triceps brachii behind.

It gives origin to muscular fibers, especially at the upper part of the medial and lateral sides of the forearm, and forms the boundaries of a series of cone-shaped cavities, in which the muscles are contained.

Besides the vertical septa separating the individual muscles, transverse septa are given off both on the volar and dorsal surfaces of the forearm, separating the deep from the superficial layers of muscles.

Apertures exist in the fascia for the passage of vessels and nerves; one of these apertures of large size, situated at the front of the elbow, serves for the passage of a communicating branch between the superficial and deep veins.
