= Palmaris longus muscle =

Muscle of the upper limb

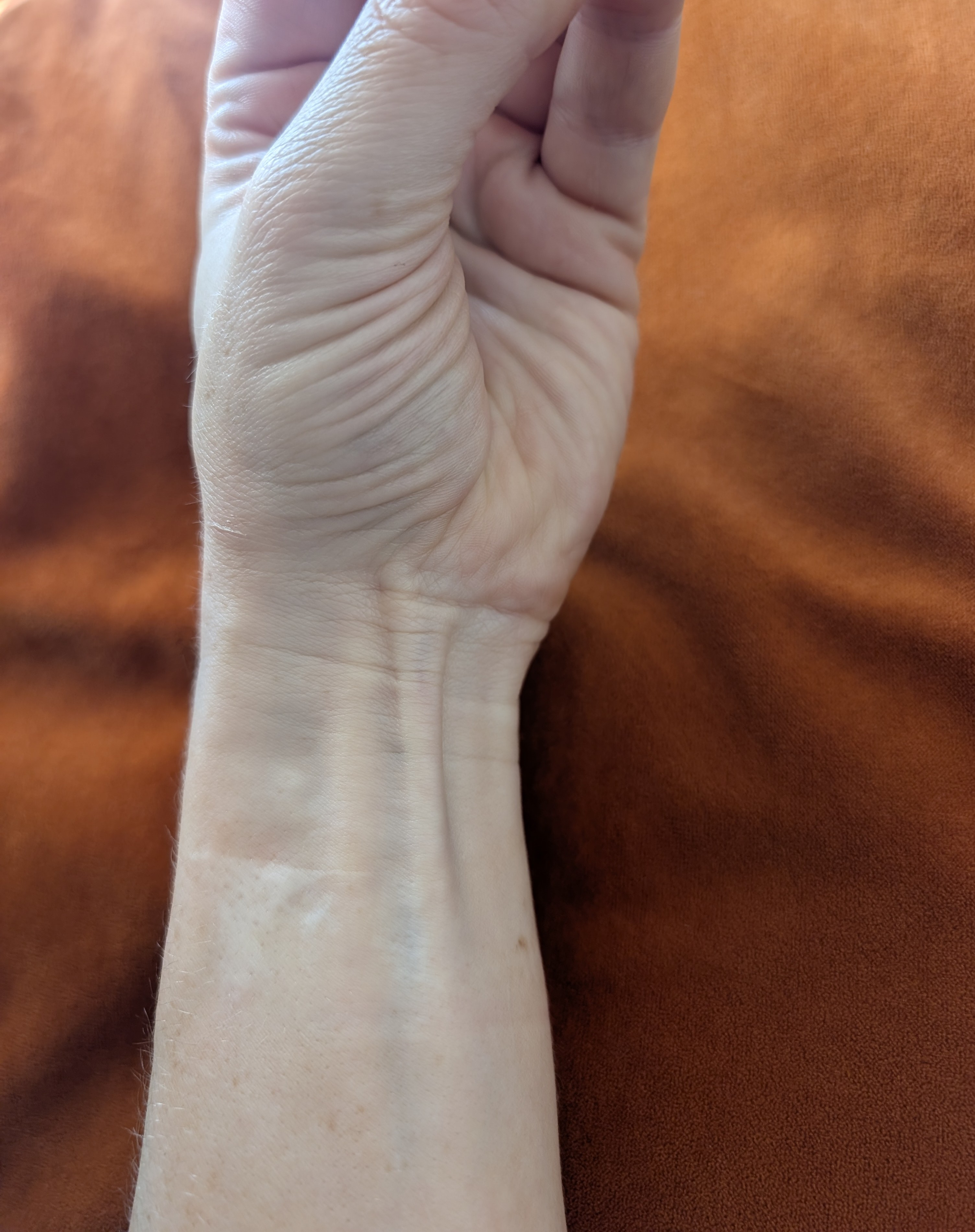
- The Palmaris longus tendon is visible in the centre, flanked by the tendons of flexor carpi radialis and flexor carpi ulnaris.

Details
- Origin: Medial epicondyle of humerus (common flexor tendon)
- Insertion: Palmar aponeurosis and flexor retinaculum of the hand
- Artery: Ulnar artery
- Nerve: Median nerve
- Actions: Wrist flexor
- Antagonist: Extensor carpi radialis brevis, extensor carpi radialis longus, extensor carpi ulnaris

Identifiers
- Latin: musculus palmaris longus
- Greek: μακρός παλαμικός μυς
- TA98: A04.6.02.029
- TA2: 2482
- FMA: 38462

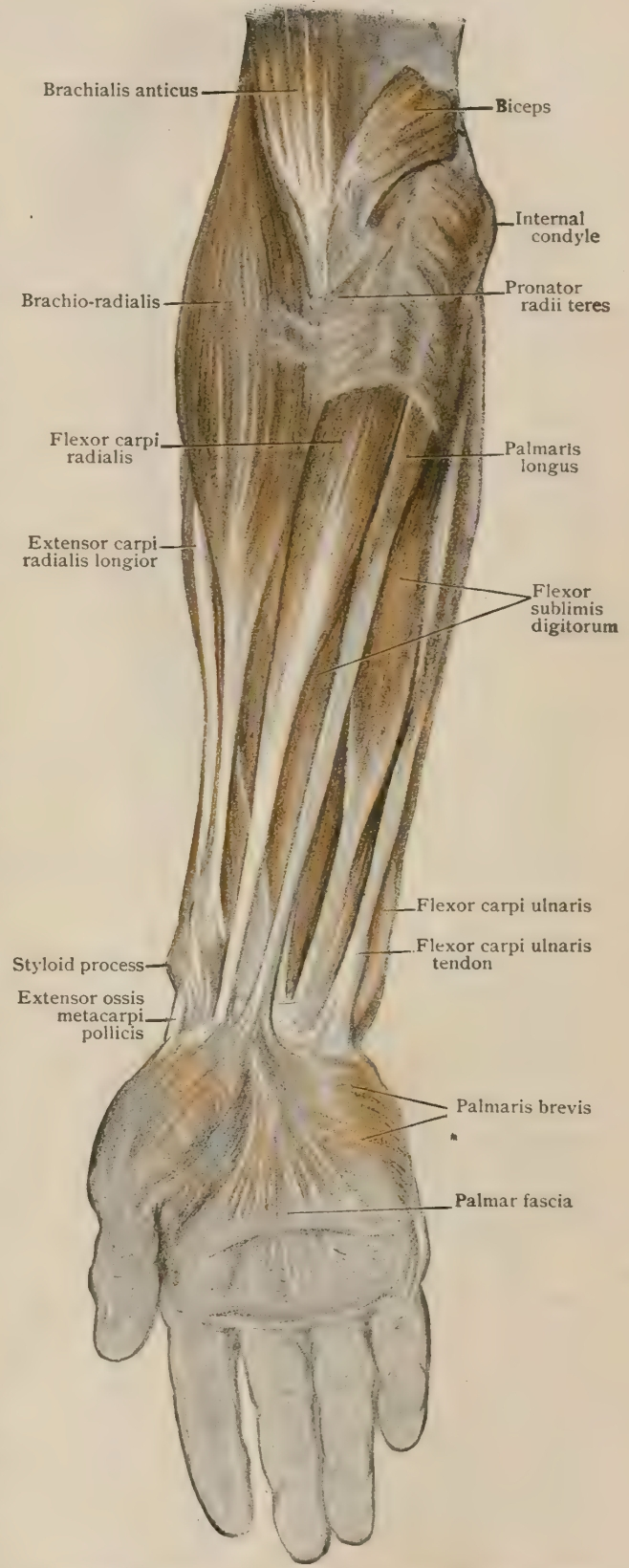
Superficial dissection of forearm and palm, anterior aspect. Portion of antebrachial fascia covering origin of superficial muscles has been left in place (right upper limb).

The palmaris longus is a muscle visible as a small tendon located between the flexor carpi radialis and the flexor carpi ulnaris, although it is not always present. Reviews report rates of absence in the general population ranging from 10–20%; however, the rate varies in different ethnic groups. Absence of the palmaris longus does not have an effect on grip strength. The palmaris longus muscle can be observed by touching the pads of the fourth finger and thumb and flexing the wrist. The tendon, if present, will be visible in the midline of the anterior wrist. It is one of the five muscles that make up the so-called "flexor-pronator mass".

== Structure ==
Palmaris longus is a slender, elongated, spindle shaped muscle, lying on the medial side of the flexor carpi radialis. It is widest in the middle, and narrowest at the proximal and distal attachments.

It arises mainly from the medial epicondyle of the humerus via the common flexor tendon. It also takes origin from the adjacent intermuscular septa and from the antebrachial fascia.

It ends in a slender, flattened tendon, which passes over the upper part of the flexor retinaculum and inserts onto the central part of the flexor retinaculum and lower part of the palmar aponeurosis. Frequently, it sends a tendinous slip to the short muscles of the thumb.

=== Nerve supply ===
The palmaris longus is innervated by the median nerve.

=== Variation ===
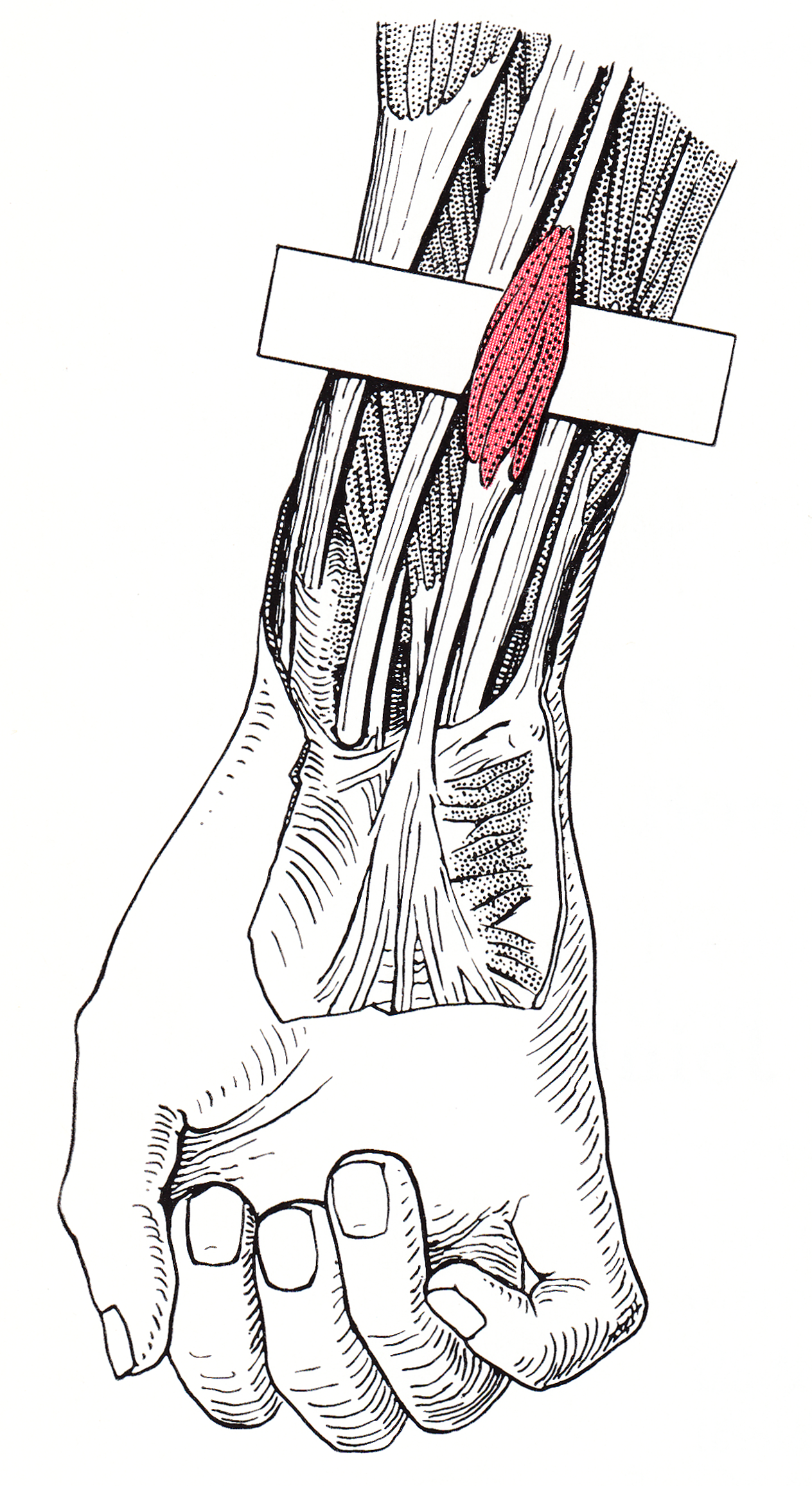
Palmaris Longus: misplaced or absent The fleshy belly occasionally migrates distally and comes to lie close above the wrist, as here. Palmaris Longus was absent in 98 of 716 dissected limbs (i.e., in 13.7% of 358 paired limbs, 26 times in both limbs, 26 in the right only, and 20 in the left only. (R. K. George).

The palmaris longus muscle is a variable muscle. The most common variation is its absence. Several in vivo and in vitro studies have documented the prevalence or absence of the PL tendon in different ethnic groups. Between 5.5 and 24% of Caucasian populations (European and North American) and 4.6 to 26.6% of Asian populations (Chinese, Japanese, Indian, Turkish, Malaysian) have been reported to lack the PL tendon.

There are also variations related to its form. It may be tendinous above and muscular below; or it may be muscular in the center with a tendon above and below; or it may present two muscular bundles with a central tendon; or finally it may consist solely of a tendinous band. The muscle may be double, or missing entirely. Slips of origin from the coronoid process or from the radius have been seen. Partial or complete insertion into the fascia of the forearm, into the tendon of the flexor carpi ulnaris and pisiform bone, into the scaphoid, and into the muscles of the little finger have been observed.

== Clinical significance ==
=== Use in tendon grafts ===
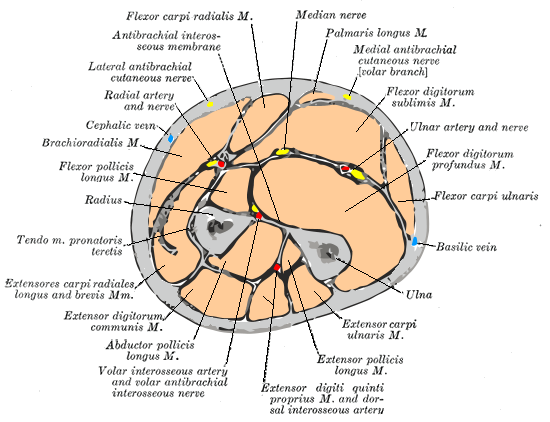
Cross-section through the middle of the left forearm

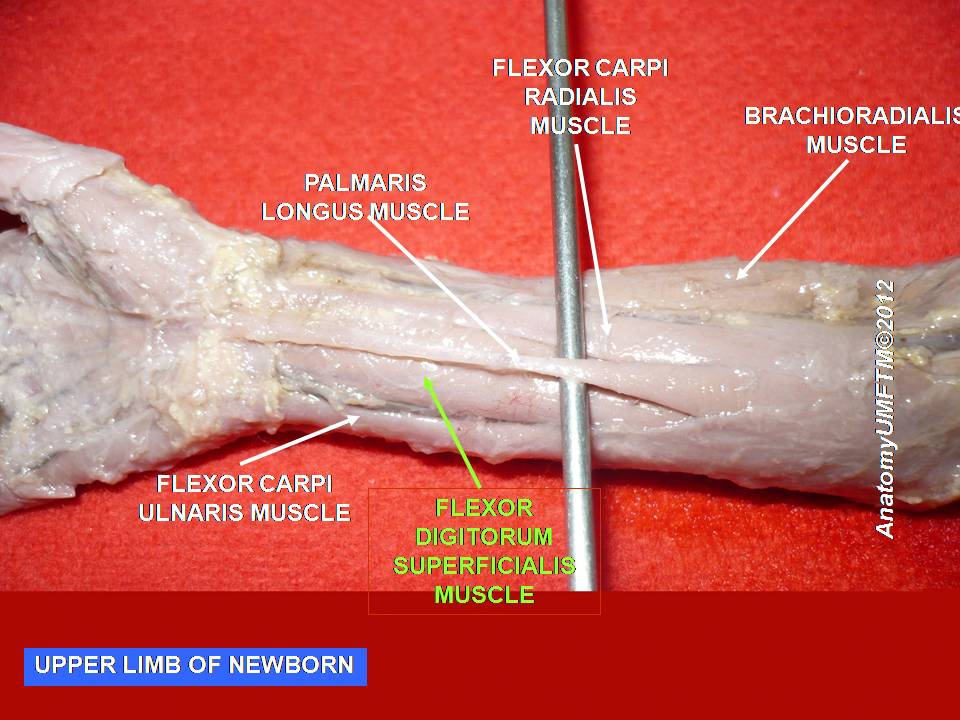
Cadaveric palmaris longus (right upper limb)

The palmaris longus muscle is the most popular for use in tendon grafts for the wrist due to the length and diameter of the palmaris longus tendon, and the fact that it can be used without producing any functional deformities. When a tendon becomes ruptured in the wrist, the palmaris longus tendon may be removed from the flexor retinaculum and grafted to take the place of the ruptured tendon. The tendons most commonly replaced or supplemented by the palmaris longus tendon when ruptured are the long flexors of the fingers and the flexor pollicis longus tendon.

The palmaris longus muscle itself is a weak flexor, and provides no substantial flexing force that would inhibit movement in the wrist if its tendon were cut and moved elsewhere. The palmaris longus may contribute and assist in thumb abduction movements; an action necessary to open the hand. If the palmaris longus muscle is not available for harvesting in an individual, the anatomically homologous plantaris muscle in the leg may be taken instead. Using the patient’s own tendon is advantageous, as it does not introduce foreign material into the body.

=== Carpal tunnel syndrome and palmaris longus variants ===
Of the known anatomical variants of the palmaris longus, the reverse belly of the palmaris longus may be localized within the carpal tunnel producing symptoms of carpal tunnel syndrome. Knowledge of this variation is important to prevent unnecessary carpal tunnel release surgery, in which the median nerve compression may remain unresolved due to the presence of this palmaris longus variant.

== Other animals ==
=== Evolution ===
The evolutionary interpretation of the muscle's absence is that humans inherited the muscle through common descent, and numerous animals that humans share a common ancestor with (such as the orangutan) still actively employ the muscle. Close primate relatives (such as the chimpanzee and gorilla) also do not actively employ the muscle, and hence they also demonstrate the same variability. The common descent principle suggests that at some stage our ancestors employed the muscle actively. The thumb apparatus (and particularly the thenar muscle group) then started developing in the hominin branch, and consequently the Palmaris longus became vestigial. As there is no apparent evolutionary pressure (positive or negative) concerning the muscle, it has remained largely unaffected by evolutionary processes.

== See also ==
- Palmaris brevis muscle
- Sternalis muscle
