= Extensor carpi radialis longus muscle =

One of five forearm muscles controlling the wrist

Extensor carpi radialis longus
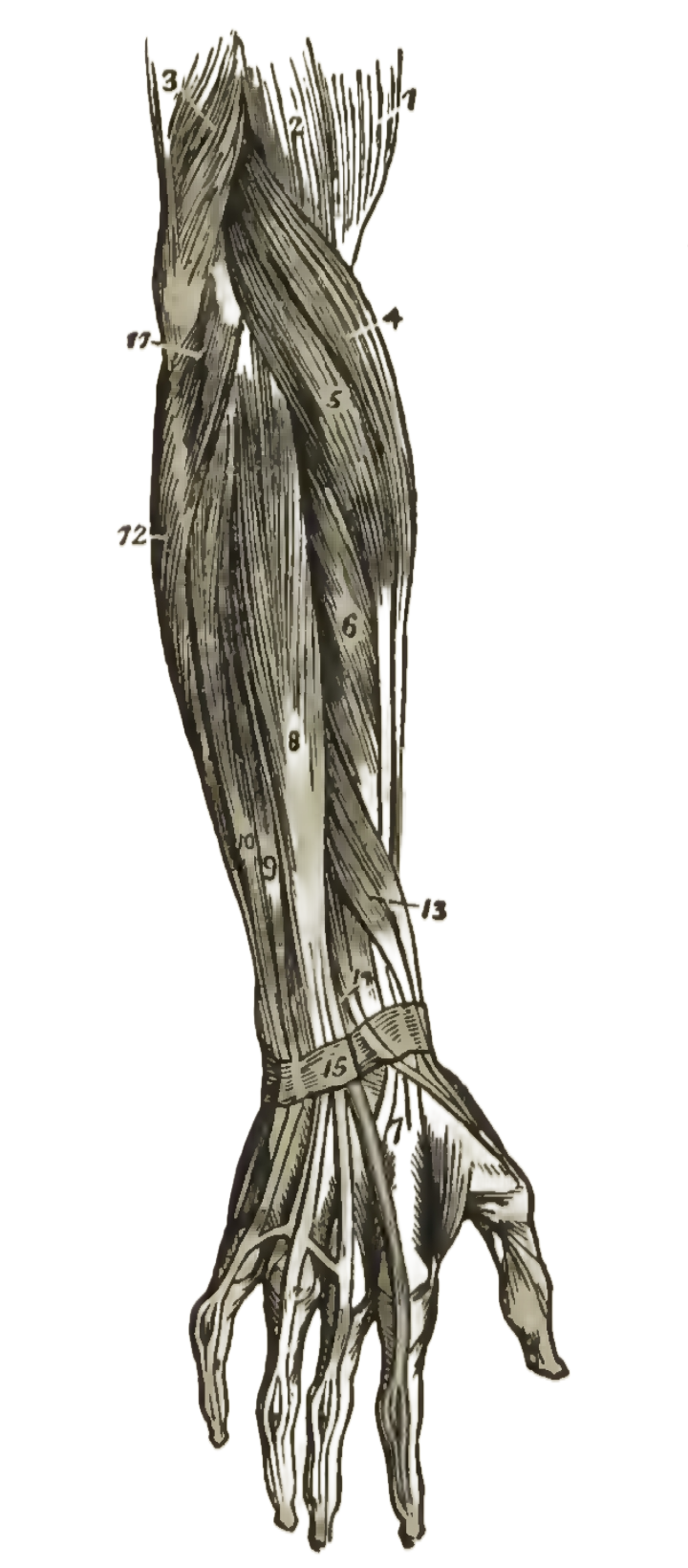
- Posterior view of the superficial muscles of the right forearm. Extensor carpi radialis longus is labelled 5. The extensor carpi radialis brevis is labeled 6. (From Quain's Anatomy.)

- Transverse section across the right-sided wrist and digits. (Ext. carp. rad. long. labeled at center left.)

Details
- Origin: Lateral supracondylar ridge
- Insertion: 2nd metacarpal
- Artery: Radial artery
- Nerve: Radial nerve
- Actions: Extensor at the wrist joint, abducts the hand at the wrist
- Antagonist: Flexor carpi ulnaris muscle

Identifiers
- Latin: musculus extensor carpi radialis longus
- TA98: A04.6.02.040
- TA2: 2497
- FMA: 38494

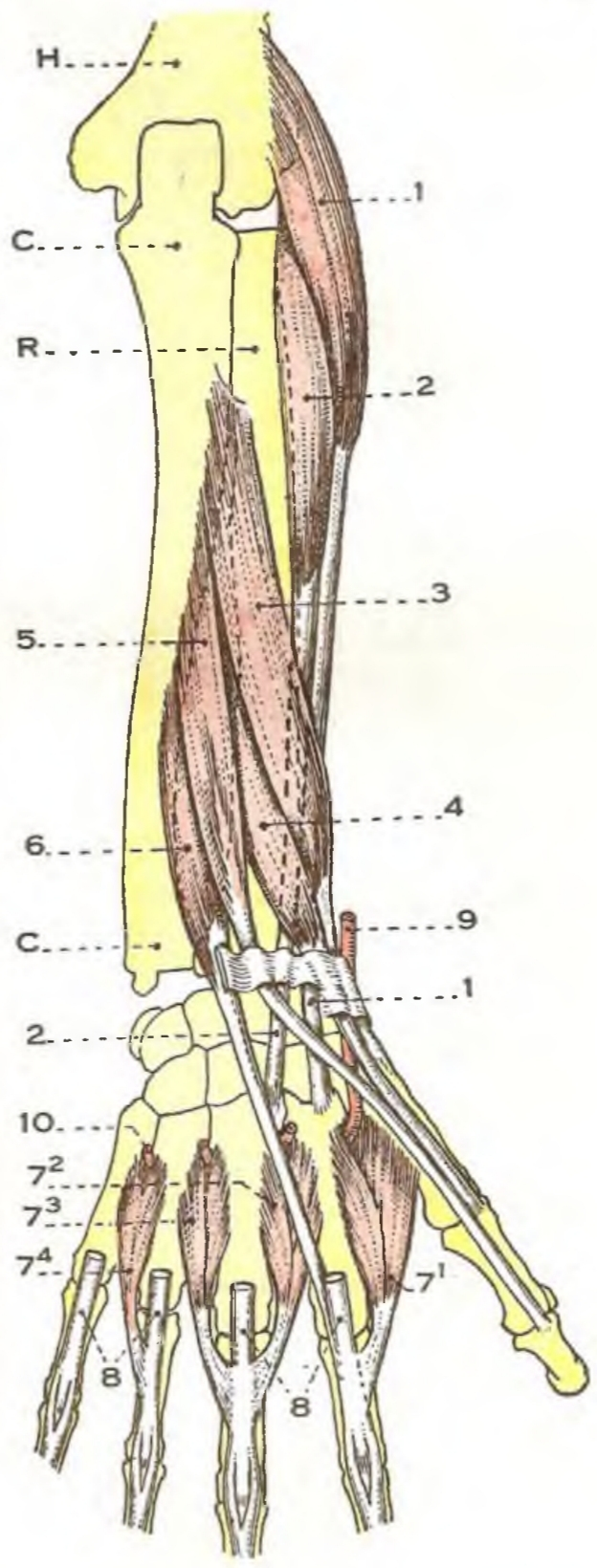
Anatomical cartoon showing several deep muscles of the posterior aspect of the right forearm and hand. The extensor carpi radialis longus is labeled 1. The extensor carpi radialis brevis is labeled 2. (From Testut's Anatomy)

The extensor carpi radialis longus is one of the five main muscles that control movements at the wrist. This muscle is quite long, starting on the lateral side of the humerus, and attaching to the base of the second metacarpal bone (metacarpal of the index finger).

== Structure ==
It originates from the lateral supracondylar ridge of the humerus, from the lateral intermuscular septum, and by a few fibers from the lateral epicondyle of the humerus.

The fibers end at the upper third of the forearm in a flat tendon, which runs along the lateral border of the radius, beneath the abductor pollicis longus and extensor pollicis brevis; it then passes beneath the dorsal carpal ligament, where it lies in a groove on the back of the radius common to it and the extensor carpi radialis brevis, immediately behind the styloid process.

One of the three muscles of the radial forearm group, it initially lies beside the brachioradialis, but becomes mostly tendon early on. Passing between the brachioradialis and the extensor carpi radialis brevis, this tendon continues into the second tendon compartment together with the latter muscle.

It is inserted into the dorsal surface of the base of the metacarpal of the index finger (second metacarpal).

=== Innervation ===
The extensor carpi radialis longus is a wrist extensor that is innervated by the radial nerve, from spinal roots C6 and C7. All other major extensor muscles in the superficial layer of the posterior compartment (the extensor digitorum, extensor carpi radialis brevis, extensor carpi ulnaris, and extensor digiti minimi) are innervated by the posterior interosseous branch of the radial nerve.

== Function ==
As the name suggests, this muscle is an extensor at the wrist joint and travels along the radial side of the arm, so it will also abduct (radial abduction) the hand at the wrist. That is, it manipulates the wrist so as to move the hand towards the thumb (i.e. abduction—away from the mid-position of the hand) and away from the palmar side (i.e. extension—increased angle between the palm and the front of the forearm).

== Exercises ==
The muscle, like all extensors of the forearm, can be strengthened by exercise that resist its extension.

=== Example exercises ===
- Reverse wrist curls with dumbbells can be performed.

== Additional images ==
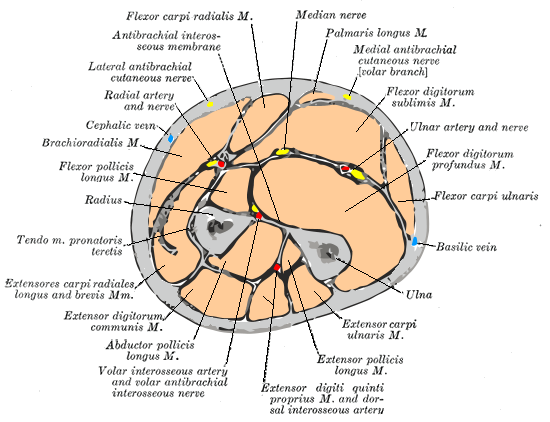
Cross-section through the middle of the right forearm.

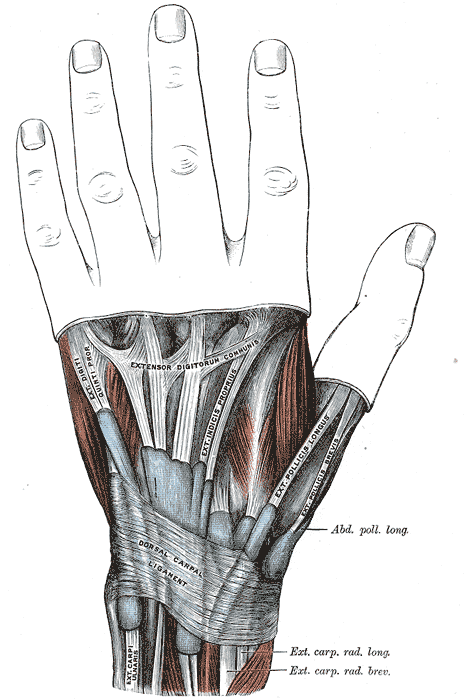
The mucous sheaths of the tendons on the back of the left wrist.
