= Palmar carpal ligament =

Ligament of the hand

Details

Identifiers
- Latin: ligamentum carpale palmare
- TA2: 2545

The palmar carpal ligament (also volar carpal ligament or Guyon's Tunnel) is but a thickening of antebrachial fascia (deep fascia of forearm) on the anterior/palmar side of the wrist which - together with the flexor retinaculum of the hand - holds the tendons of most of the flexor muscles of the hand.

The palmar carpal ligament corresponds in location and structure to the extensor retinaculum of the hand also known as the dorsal carpal ligament, on the posterior/dorsal side of the wrist with which the PCL is continuous as both are formations of the antebrachial fascia. The flexor retinaculum is also known as the transverse carpal ligament.

== Anatomy ==
=== Relations ===
The palmar carpal ligament is superficial and proximal to the flexor retinaculum. The ulnar nerve and the ulnar artery run through the ulnar canal, which is deep to the palmar carpal ligament and superficial to the flexor retinaculum.
