= Cervical spinal nerve 7 =

Spinal nerve of the cervical segment

Cervical spinal nerve
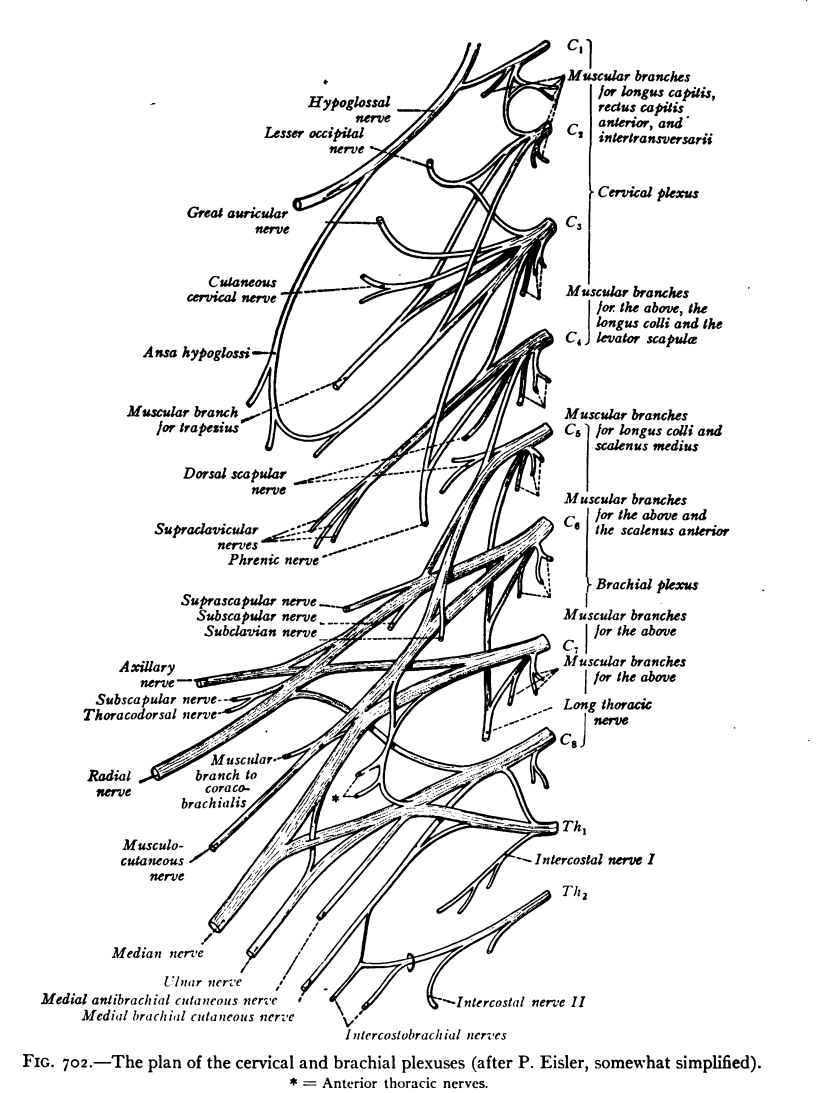
- The plan of the cervical and brachial plexuses.

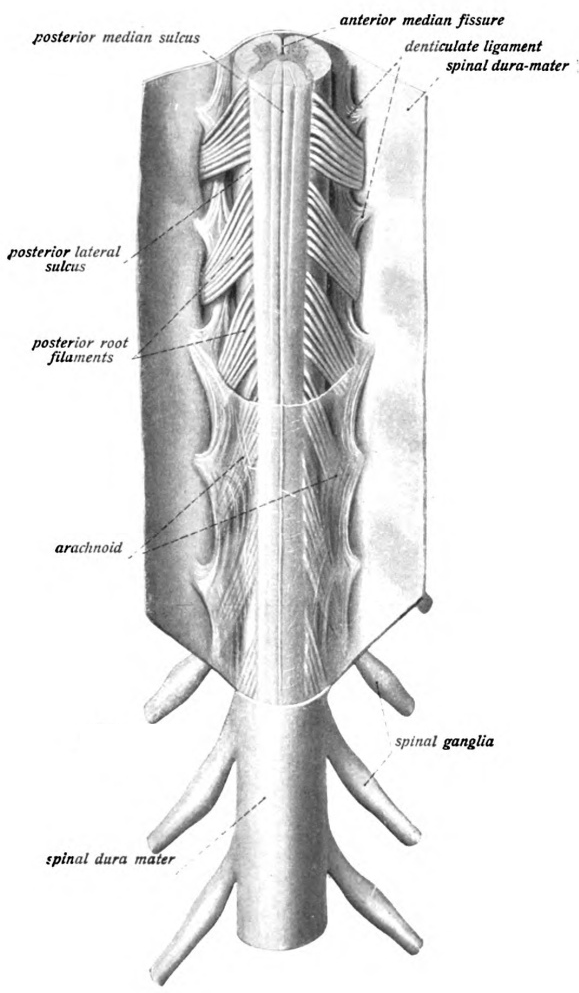
- The spinal cord with spinal nerves.

Details

Identifiers
- Latin: nervi spinalis
- FMA: 6448

The cervical spinal nerve 7 (C7) is a spinal nerve of the cervical segment.

It originates from the spinal column from above the cervical vertebra 7 (C7).

It runs through the interspace between the C6 and C7 vertebrae.

== Additional images ==
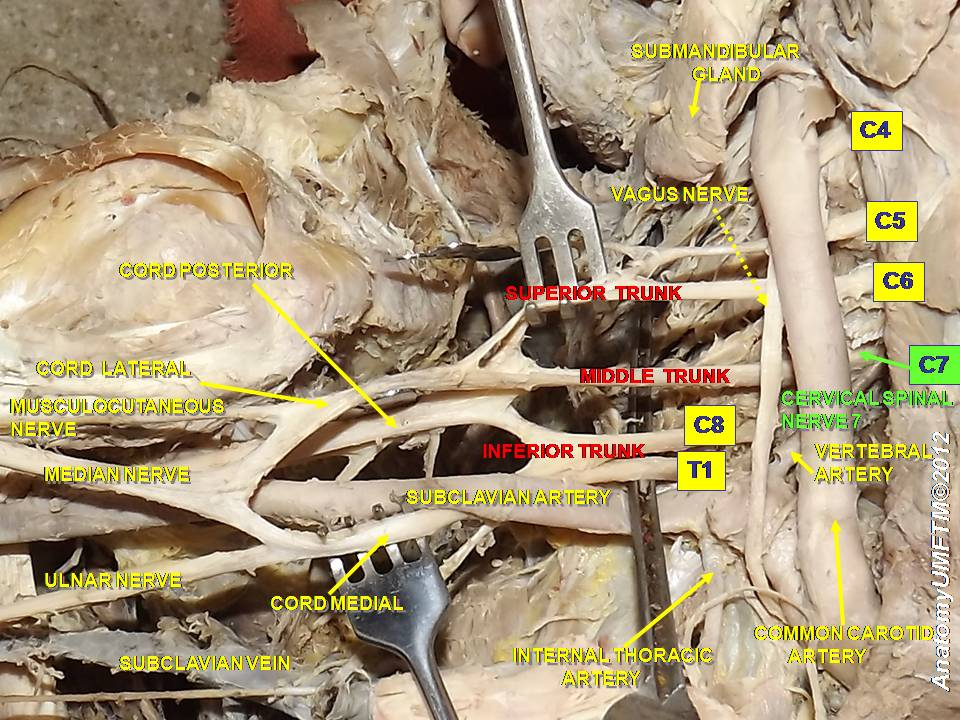
Cervical spinal nerve 7
