= Extensor retinaculum of the hand =

Ligament in the forearm near the hand

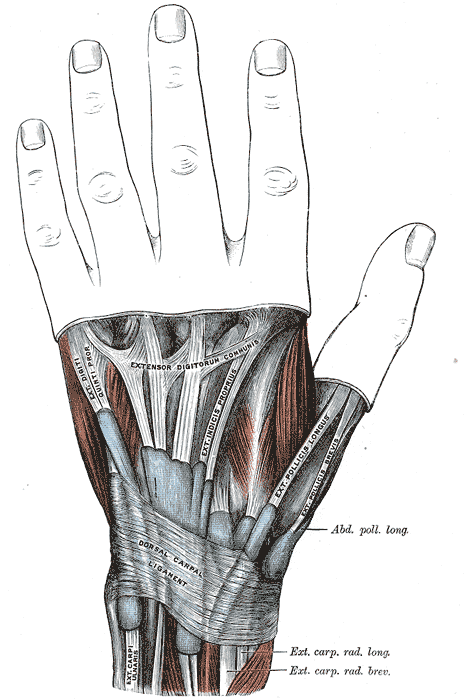
- The mucous sheaths of the tendons on the back of the wrist. (Dorsal carpal ligament labeled at bottom center.)

Details

Identifiers
- Latin: retinaculum musculorum extensorum manus
- TA98: A04.6.03.010
- TA2: 2546
- FMA: 39987

The extensor retinaculum (dorsal carpal ligament, or posterior annular ligament) is but a thickening of the antebrachial fascia (deep fascia of forearm) that holds the tendons of the extensor muscles in place. It is located on the back of the forearm, just proximal to the hand. It is continuous with the palmar carpal ligament (which is located on the anterior side of the forearm).

== Structure ==
The extensor retinaculum is a strong, fibrous band, extending obliquely downward and medialward across the back of the wrist. It consists of part of the deep fascia of the back of the forearm, strengthened by the addition of some transverse fibers.

=== Relations ===
There are six separate synovial sheaths run beneath the extensor retinaculum: (1st) abductor pollicis longus and extensor pollicis brevis tendons, (2nd) extensor carpi radialis longus and brevis tendons, (3rd) extensor pollicis longus tendon, (4th) extensor digitorium communis and extensor indicis proprius tendons, (5th) extensor digiti minimi tendon and (6th) extensor carpi ulnaris tendon.

On the dorsal side of the hand, the palmar carpal ligament corresponds in location and structure to the extensor retinaculum, both being formations of the antebrachial fascia and therefore continuous. Consequently, the flexor retinaculum is commonly referred to as the transverse carpal ligament to avoid confusion.

=== Histology ===
Structurally, the retinaculum consists of three layers. The deepest layer, the gliding layer, consists of hyaluronic acid-secreting cells. The thick middle layer consists of interspersed elastin fibers, collagen bundles, and fibroblasts. The most superficial layer is made up of loose connective tissue which contains vascular channels. Combined these three layers create a smooth gliding surface as well as mechanically strong tissue which prevents tendon bowstringing. The extensor retinaculum of the foot has similar structure.

== Clinical significance ==
Studies conducted on the retinaculum have exhibited it to have several possible surgical treatments uses. A graft of the extensor retinaculum was shown to be useful in treating boxer's knuckle when direct repair of the damaged capsule is not possible. Because of their similarities in histological structure, studies also show the extensor retinaculum to be a reasonable biological replacement for reconstruction of a deficient annular pulley.

== Additional images ==
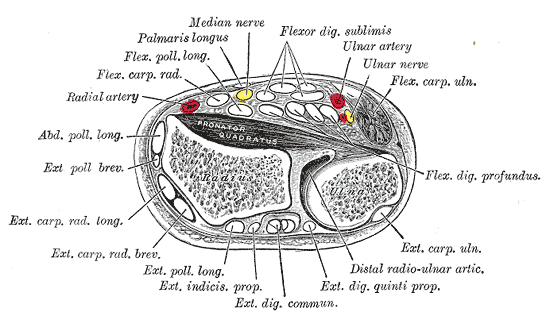
Transverse section across distal ends of radius and ulna.

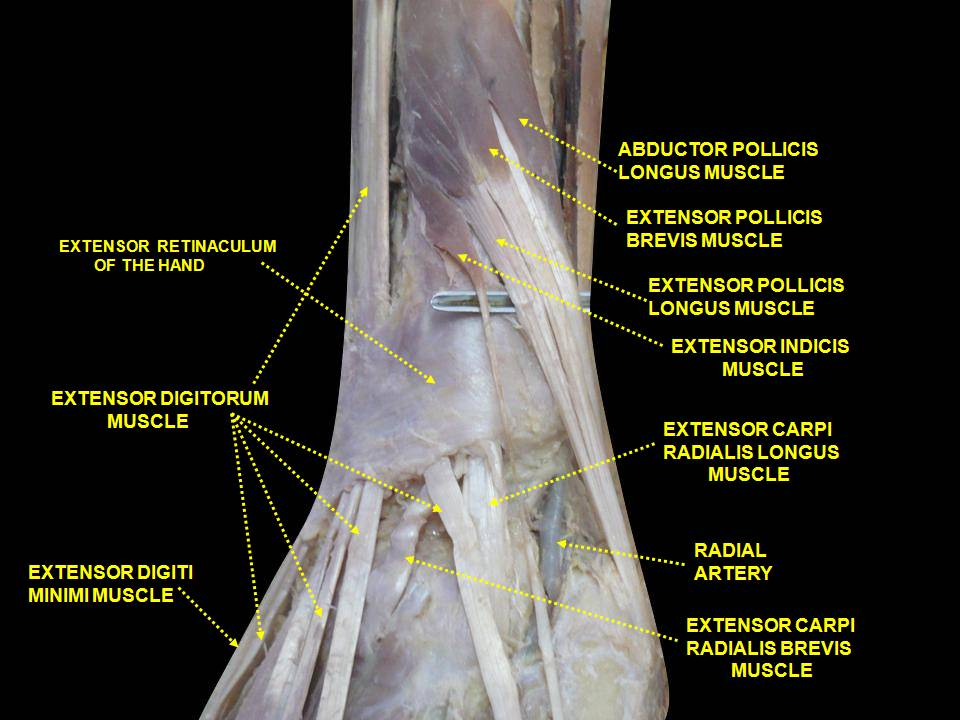
Extensor retinaculum of the hand. Deep dissection.
