= Wrist curl =

Weight training exercise

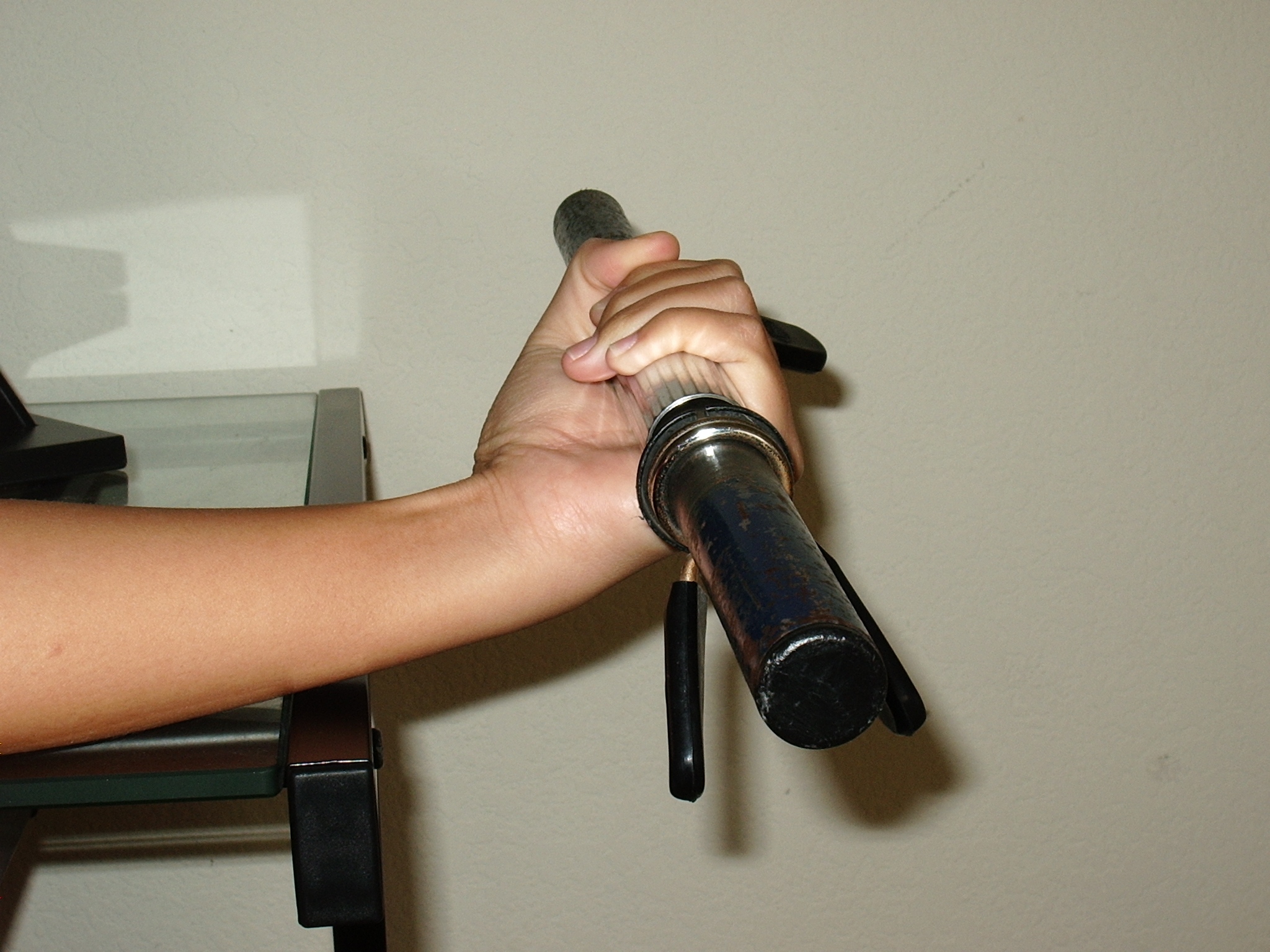
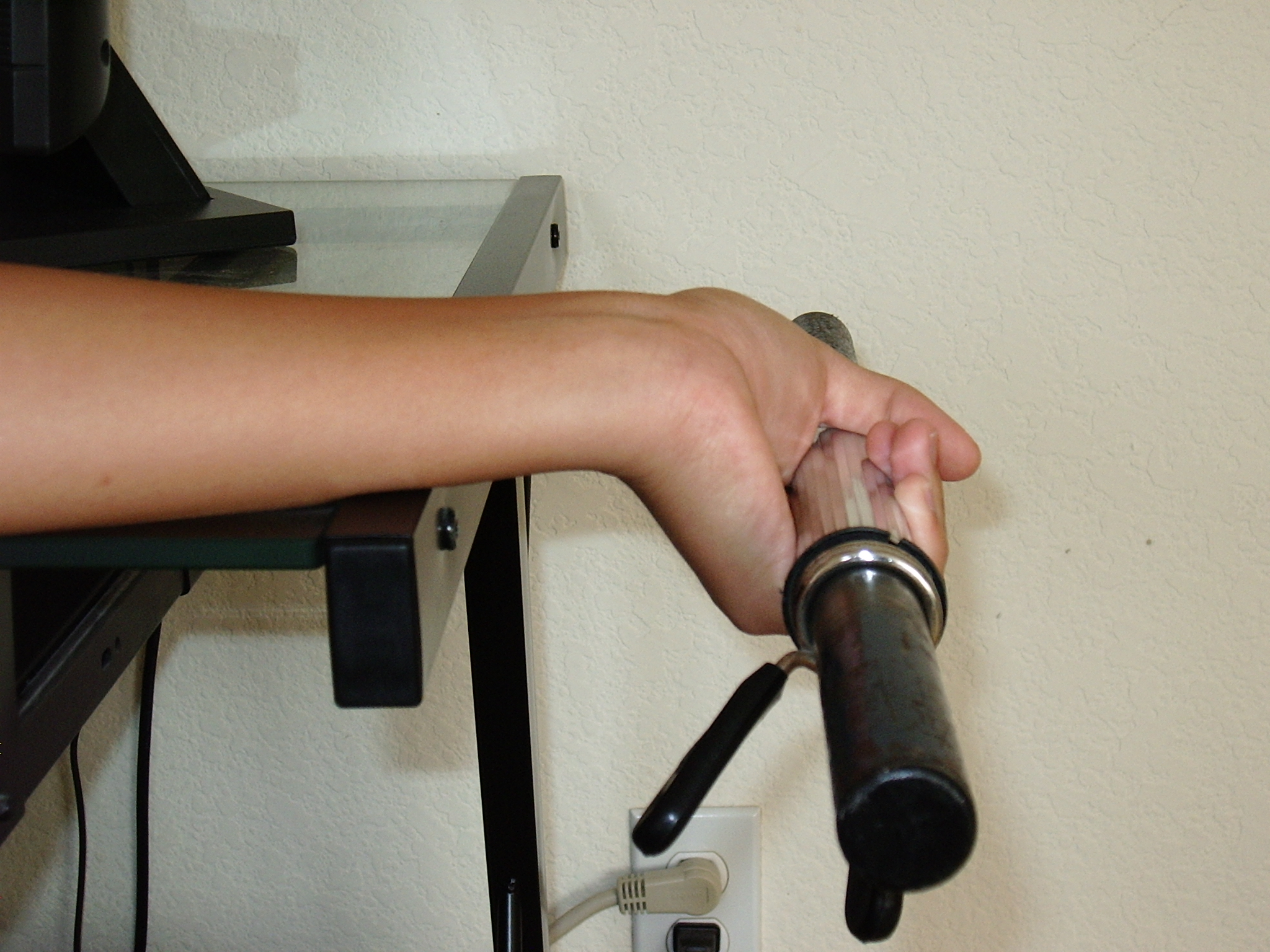
Forearm Flexion

The wrist curl is a weight training exercise for developing the wrist flexor muscles, the muscles in the front of the forearm. Ideally, it should be done in combination with the "reverse wrist curl" (also called wrist extension) which works out the muscles comprising the back of the forearms, to ensure equal development of the wrist flexor and wrist extensor muscles.

Wrist curls can be performed with a dumbbell or with both hands holding a barbell.

== Seated wrist curl ==
To perform a seated wrist curl, the lifter should be seated on a utility bench with knees bent and the forearm(s) resting on the thigh, or with forearms on a bench and hands hanging off the edge. The palm should be facing up and the hand should be free to move completely up and down. At the starting point, the wrist should be bent back so that the fingers are almost pointing down at the floor. In a steady motion, the lifter should raise the weight by using the forearm muscles to bring the hand up as far as possible. The forearm itself should remain resting on the thigh. Then the weight should be slowly lowered back down to the starting point.

== Standing wrist curl ==
To perform a standing wrist curl, a barbell can be held in both hands with the palms facing backward. The bar should be behind the lifter. The same motion should be performed as in the seated wrist curl. The range of motion will be smaller but the standing wrist curl offers the benefit of providing the most stress on the target muscles at their peak contraction.
