= Thoracic spinal nerve 1 =

Thoracic spinal nerve
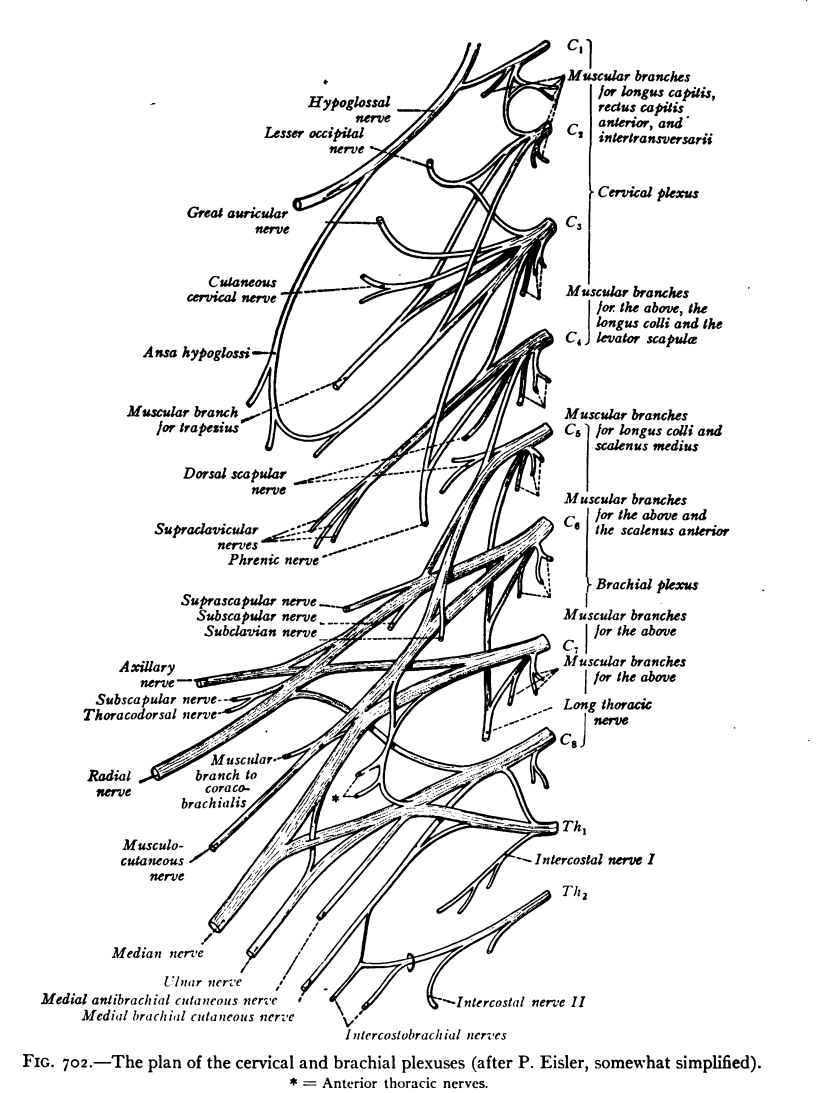
- The plan of the cervical and brachial plexuses.

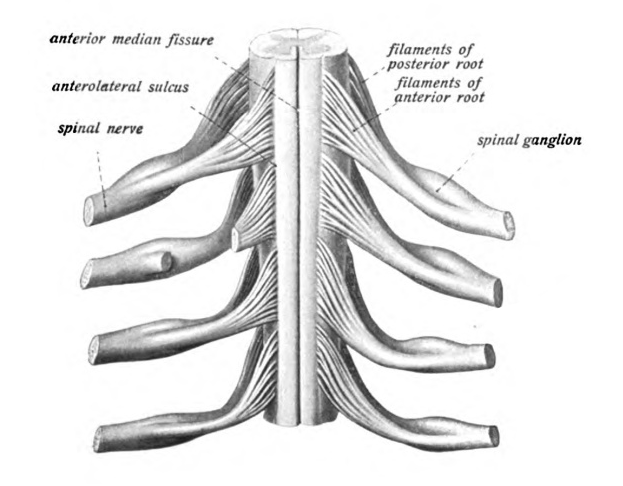
- The spinal cord with spinal nerves.

Details

Identifiers
- Latin: nervi spinalis
- FMA: 6037

The thoracic spinal nerve 1 (T1) is a spinal nerve of the thoracic segment.

It originates from the spinal column from below the thoracic vertebra 1 (T1).

== Additional images ==
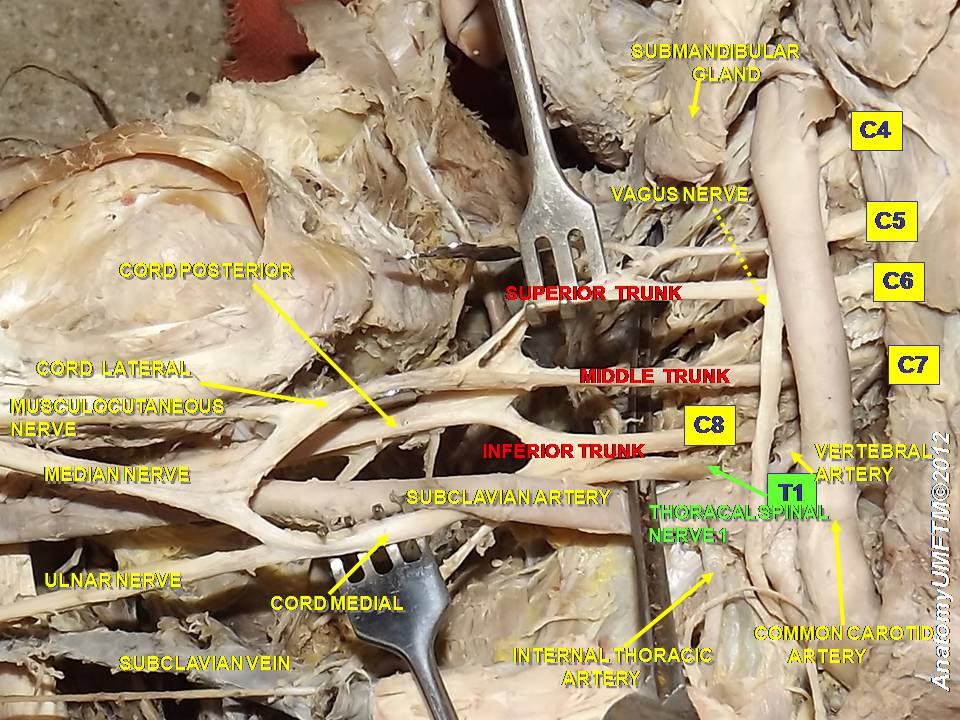
Thoracic spinal nerve 1
