= Pollicis longus muscle =

Pollicis longus muscle may refer to:

- Abductor pollicis longus muscle
- Extensor pollicis longus muscle
- Flexor pollicis longus muscle
