= Bennett's fracture =

Bone fracture at the base of the thumb

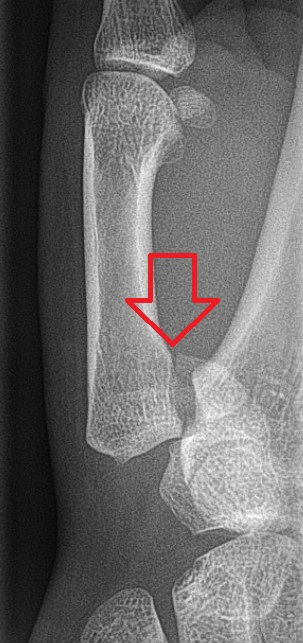
- Bennett's fracture on x-ray
- Specialty: Orthopedic

Bennett's fracture or Bennett fracture is a type of partial broken finger involving the base of the thumb, and extends into the carpometacarpal (CMC) joint. According to the Metacalamity classification, it is categorized as "I1". Treatment typically requires surgery. This intra-articular fracture is the most common type of fracture of the thumb, and is nearly always accompanied by some degree of subluxation or frank dislocation of the carpometacarpal joint.

== Symptoms and signs ==
Symptoms of Bennett fracture are instability of the CMC joint of the thumb, accompanied by pain and weakness of the pinch grasp. Characteristic signs include pain, swelling, and ecchymosis around the base of the thumb and thenar eminence, and especially over the CMC joint of the thumb. Physical examination demonstrates instability of the CMC joint of the thumb. The patient will often manifest a weakened ability to grasp objects or perform such tasks as tying shoes and tearing a piece of paper. Other complaints include intense pain experienced upon catching the thumb on an object, such as when reaching into a pants pocket.

=== Complications ===
Many important activities of daily life are dependent on the ability to grasp, pinch, and oppose the thumb. In fact, thumb function constitutes about 50% of overall hand function. These abilities are in turn dependent on an intact and functional thumb CMC joint. The CMC joint of the thumb allows a wide range of motion while maintaining stability for grasp and pinch.

With this in mind, failure to properly recognize and treat the Bennett fracture will not only result in an unstable, painful, arthritic CMC joint with diminished range of motion: it will also result in a hand with greatly diminished overall function.

In the case of the Bennett fracture, the proximal metacarpal fragment remains attached to the anterior oblique ligament, which in turn is attached to the tubercle of the trapezium bone of the CMC joint. This ligamentous attachment ensures that the proximal fragment remains in its correct anatomical position.

The distal fragment of the first metacarpal bone possesses the majority of the articular surface of the first CMC joint. Unlike the proximal fracture fragment, strong ligaments and muscle tendons of the hand tend to pull this fragment out of its correct anatomical position.

Specifically:

- tension from the abductor pollicis longus muscle (APL) subluxates the fragment in a dorsal, radial, and proximal direction
- tension from the APL rotates the fragment into supination
- tension from the adductor pollicis muscle (ADP) displaces the metacarpal head into the palm

Tension from the APL and ADP muscles frequently leads to displacement of the fracture fragments, even in cases where the fracture fragments are initially in their proper anatomic position. Because of the aforementioned biomechanical features, Bennett fractures nearly always require some form of intervention to ensure healing in the correct anatomical position and restoration of proper function of the thumb CMC joint.

== Mechanism ==
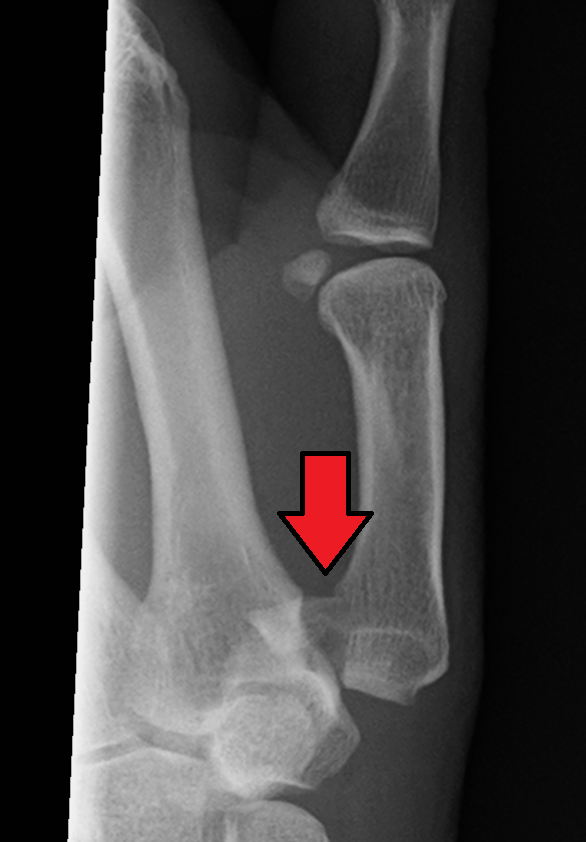
Bennett's fracture

The Bennett fracture is an oblique intraarticular metacarpal fracture dislocation, caused by an axial force directed against the partially flexed metacarpal. This type of compression along the metacarpal bone is often sustained when a person punches a hard object, such as the skull or tibia of an opponent, or a wall. It can also occur as a result of a fall onto the thumb. This is a common injury sustained from bike falls, as the thumb is generally extended while around the handle bars. It is also a common injury in car crashes, especially into fixed objects, from the driver holding the steering wheel during impact. The hand moves forward, while the steering wheel rim hyperextends the thumb. Some authors have recently made an assertion against popular belief that the APL tendon is not a deforming force on the Bennett fracture.

== Treatment ==
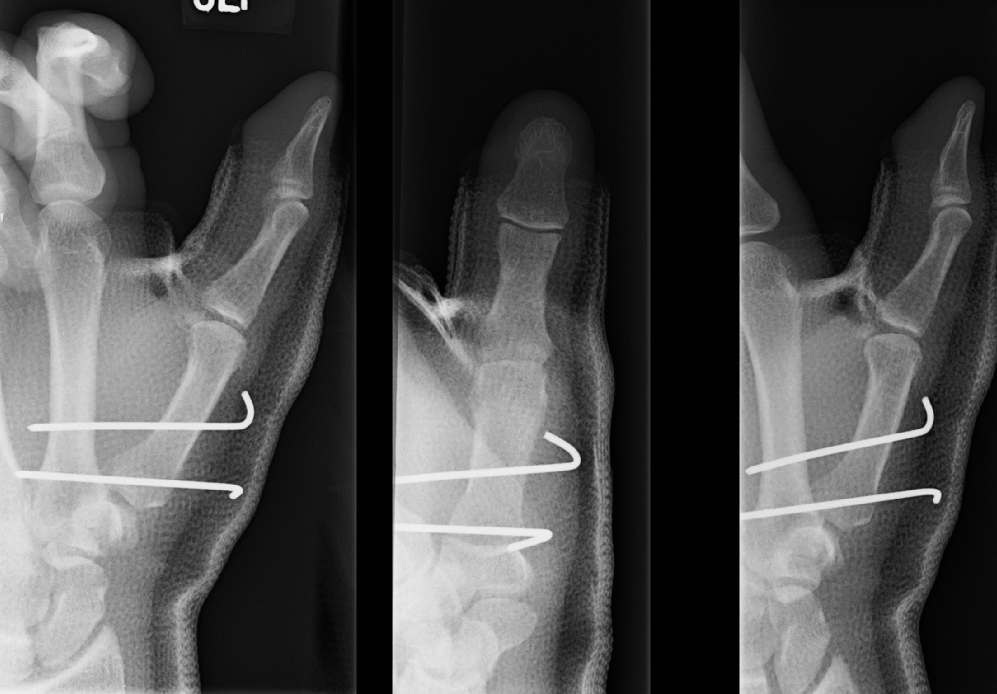
Bennett's fracture repair

Though these fractures commonly appear quite subtle or even inconsequential on radiographs, they can result in severe long-term dysfunction of the hand if left untreated. In his original description of this type of fracture in 1882, Bennett stressed the need for early diagnosis and treatment in order to prevent loss of function of the thumb CMC joint, which is critical to the overall function of the hand.

- In the most minor cases of Bennett fracture, there may be only small avulsion fractures, relatively little joint instability, and minimal subluxation of the CMC joint (less than 1 mm). In such cases, closed reduction followed by immobilization in a thumb spica cast and serial radiography may be all that is required for effective treatment.
- For Bennett fractures where there is between 1 mm and 3 mm of displacement at the trapeziometacarpal joint, closed reduction and percutaneous pin fixation (CRPP) with Kirschner wires is often sufficient to ensure a satisfactory functional outcome. The wires are not employed to connect the two fracture fragments together, but rather to secure the first or second metacarpal to the trapezium.
- For Bennett fractures where there is more than 3 mm of displacement at the trapeziometacarpal joint, open reduction and internal fixation (ORIF) is typically recommended.

Regardless of which approach is employed (nonsurgical, CRPP, or ORIF), immobilization in a cast or thumb spica splint is required for four to six weeks.

== Prognosis ==
If intraarticular trapeziometacarpal fractures (such as the Bennett or Rolando fractures) are allowed to heal in a displaced position, significant post-traumatic osteoarthritis of the base of the thumb is virtually assured. Some form of surgical treatment (typically either a CRPP or an ORIF) is nearly always recommended to ensure a satisfactory outcome for these fractures, if there is significant displacement.

The long-term outcome after surgical treatment appears to be similar, whether the CRPP or the ORIF approach is used. Specifically, the overall strength of the affected hand is typically diminished, and post-traumatic osteoarthritis tends to develop in almost all cases. The degree of weakness and the severity of osteoarthritis does however appear to correlate with the quality of reduction of the fracture. Therefore, the goal of treatment of Bennett fracture should be to achieve the most precise reduction possible, whether by the CRPP or the ORIF approach.

== Nomenclature ==
The Bennett fracture is named after Edward Hallaran Bennett, Professor of Surgery (1837–1907) at Trinity College Dublin, who described it in 1882. Bennett said his fracture "passed obliquely across the base of the bone, detaching the greater part of the articular surface, and the separated fragment was very large and the deformity that resulted there-from seemed more a dorsal subluxation of the first metacarpal".

== See also ==
- Rolando fracture
- Boxer's fracture
- Gamekeeper's thumb
