= Edward Hallaran Bennett =

Irish surgeon, president of the RCSI

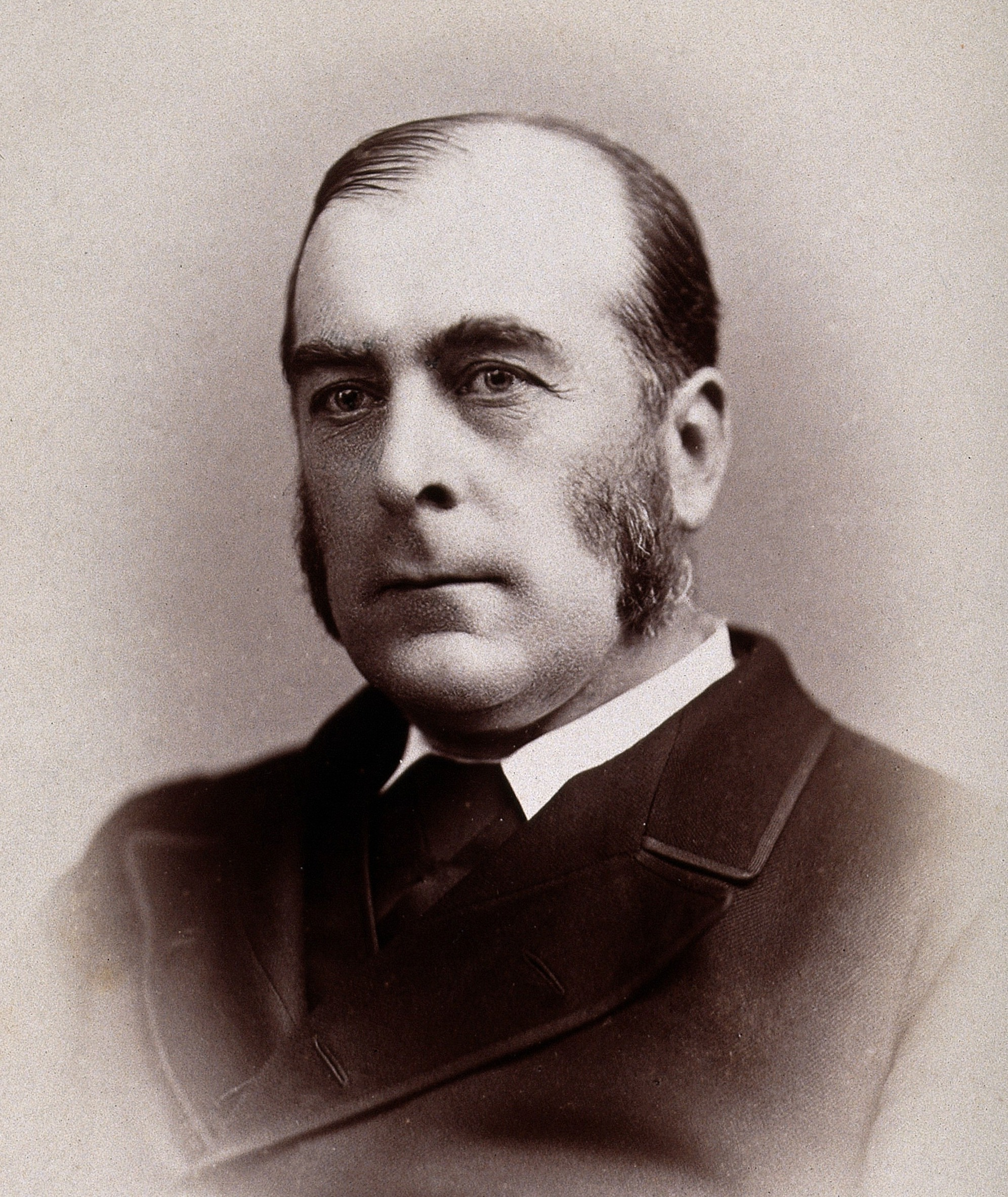
- Edward Hallaran Bennett in 1881
- Born: 9 April 1837; Cork, Ireland
- Died: 21 June 1907 (aged 70); Dublin, Ireland
- Citizenship: British
- Education: Trinity College Dublin
- Known for: Bennett's fracture
- Scientific career
- Fields: Orthopedic surgery

Edward Hallaran Bennett (9 April 1837, Charlotte Quay, Cork – 21 June 1907, Dublin) was an Irish surgeon, now remembered for describing Bennett's fracture.

== Life ==
Bennett was born at Charlotte Quay, Cork, the fifth and youngest son of the leading barrister and judge Robert Bennett, Recorder of Cork, and his wife Jane Saunders Hallaran. Both his grandfathers, James Bennett and William Saunders Hallaran, were well-known doctors: Hallaran wrote extensively on insanity. Another of Edward's close relatives was James Richard Bennett (died 1830), a distinguished lecturer in anatomy in Paris.

Bennett attended Hamblin and Porter's School in Cork, and the Academic Institute in Hardcourt Street. He studied at Trinity College Dublin, gaining a BA, and MB before graduating with a M.Ch. in 1859 and M.D. in 1864. He was professor of anatomy and surgery at the Trinity College from 1873 to 1906. He studied fractures, dislocations and bone diseases, recording them at the Pathology Museum at the Trinity College. He described his eponymous fracture at the British Medical Association meeting in Cork in 1880. He is said to have introduced antiseptic technique to Dublin, and became president of the Royal College of Surgeons in Ireland.

He married in 1870 Frances Conolly Norman, daughter of Conolly Norman of County Donegal, and cousin of the leading alienist Conolly Norman, and had two daughters, one of whom predeceased him.
