= First metacarpal bone =

Bone of the hand

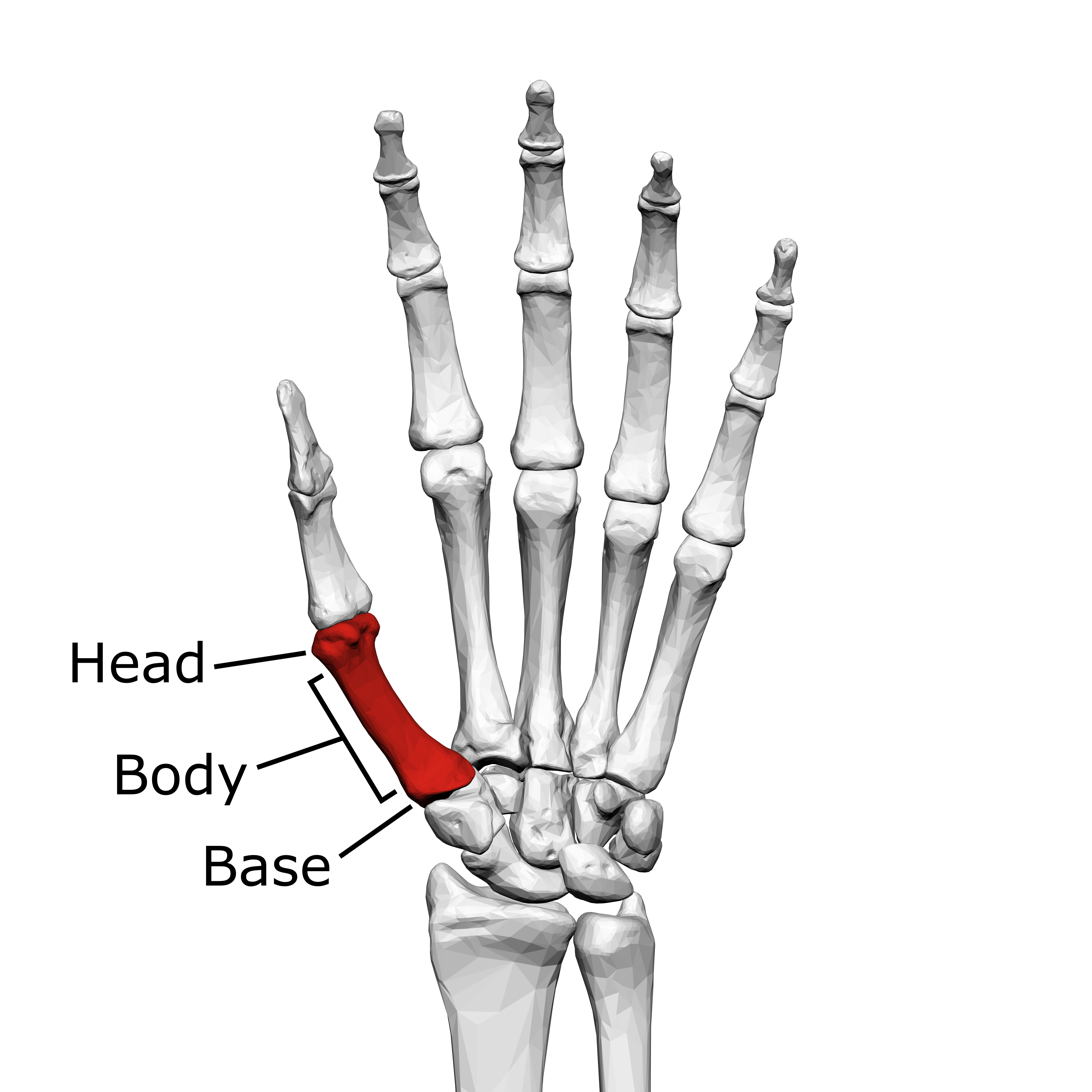
- First metacarpal of the left hand (shown in red). Palmar view.

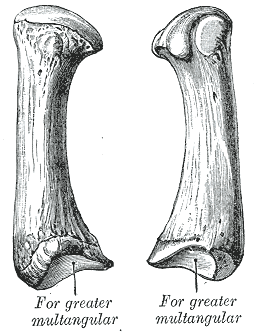
- The first metacarpal (Left)

Details

Identifiers
- Latin: os metacarpale I
- FMA: 23899

The first metacarpal bone or the metacarpal bone of the thumb is the first bone proximal to the thumb. It is connected to the trapezium of the carpus at the first carpometacarpal joint and to the proximal thumb phalanx at the first metacarpophalangeal joint.

== Characteristics ==
The first metacarpal bone is short and thick with a shaft thicker and broader than those of the other metacarpal bones. Its narrow shaft connects its widened base and rounded head; the former consisting of a thick cortical bone surrounding the open medullary canal; the latter two consisting of cancellous bone surrounded by a thin cortical shell.

=== Head ===
The head is less rounded and less spherical than those of the other metacarpals, making it better suited for a hinge-like articulation.

The distal articular surface is quadrilateral, wide, and flat; thicker and broader transversely and extends much further palmarly than dorsally. On the palmar aspect of the articular surface there is a pair of eminences or tubercles which articulate with the radial and ulnar sesamoid bones of the thumb metacarpophalangeal joint; the lateral eminence is larger than the medial.

=== Body/Shaft ===
The body or shaft is thick and broad — averaging 6 to 11 millimetres (0.24 to 0.43 in). On its dorsal side, the shaft is flat and wide, while the anteroposterior side is less pronounced; usually resulting in an oval-triangular cross-section.

The dorsal surface of the shaft is weakly convex longitudinally, while its palmar, radial, and ulnar surfaces tend to be concave. The palmar and medial surface exhibits a blunt ridge which separates a larger lateral part – the insertion of the opponens pollicis muscle – and a smaller medial part – the origin of the lateral head of the first dorsal interosseous muscle.

=== Base ===
The base is significantly different from the bases of the other metacarpals. It is trumpet-shaped and ends in a saddle-shaped articular surface matching that of the trapezial articular surface. The configuration of the thumb carpometacarpal joint plays an important role in the mechanism of opposition. The articular surface is delimited by a thick, crest-like ridge extending around its circumference.

On the palmar and lateral side of the base is the insertion of the tendon of the abductor pollicis longus muscle, usually featuring a small tubercle. The origin of the first dorsal interosseous muscle is on the ulnar aspect of the base, and can sometimes extend onto the shaft. In contrast to the other metacarpals, the first metacarpal has no articular facets on the sides of its base (for intermetacarpal articulations) because it articulates exclusively with the trapezium.

== Ossification ==
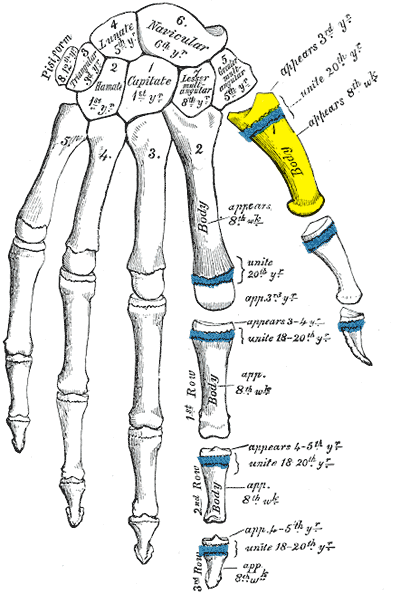
Ossification of hand bones. First metacarpal shown in yellow.

The metacarpal bone of the thumb has two centres of ossification: a primary centre in the shaft and a secondary centre in the base. This contrasts to the other four metacarpal bones where the secondary centre is found in the head. The ossification process begins in the shaft during the ninth week of prenatal life, and in the base during the second year of life in girls and the third year in boys. When the both sexes were considered together, the ossification of base of first metacarpal was seen to start between 13 and 41 months.

These centres unite before fifteenth year in girls and seventeenth year in boys.

The thumb has several associated accessory bones. When present, these bones are usually found near the base and trapezium and are the products of an additional centre of ossification, usually of the trapezium, that failed to fuse with the associated bone. Named accessory bones include:

- os trapezium secundarium - between the ulnar base of the first metacarpal and the distal margin of the trapezium
- os praetrapezium - between the thumb metacarpal and the distal aspect of the trapezium
- os paratrapezium - between the radial base of the first metacarpal and the distoradial aspect of the trapezium

== Fractures ==
Fractures to metacarpal bones account for 30-40% of all hand fractures, of which 25% occur in the first metacarpal (second to fractures to the fifth metacarpal bone). 80% of fractures to the first metacarpal occur at its base.

=== Metacalamity classification ===
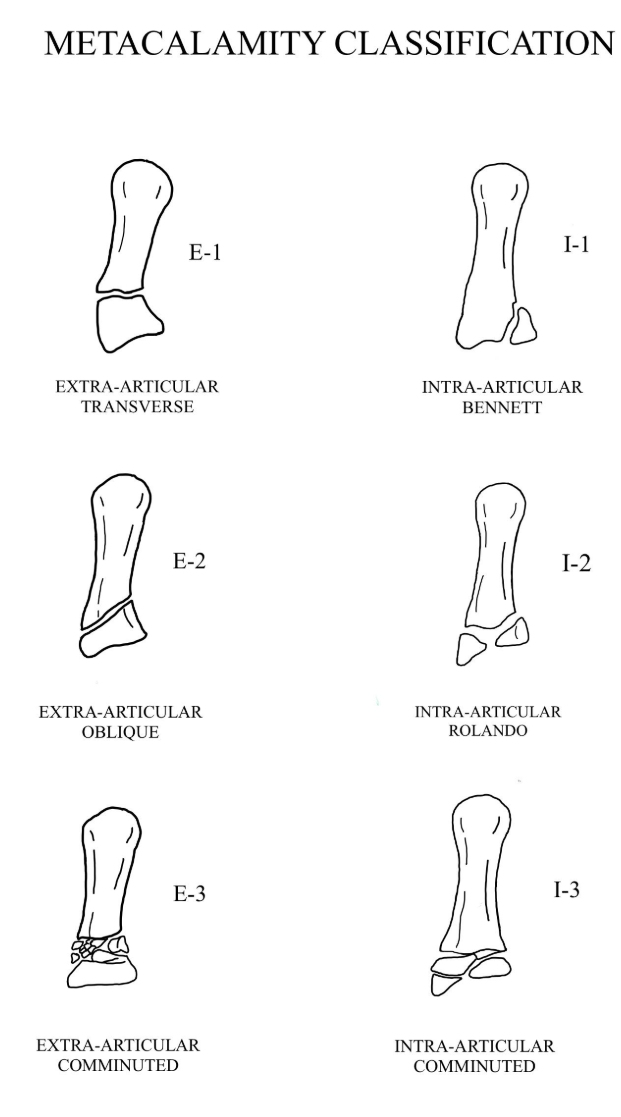
Metacalamity classification

Metacalamity classification is a system for classifying fractures of the first metacarpal base. It helps physicians to describe fractures accurately and easily, as it encompasses well-known eponyms such as Bennett fracture or Rolando fracture.

Metacalamity classification divides the first metacarpal base fracture into extra-articular (marked by "E") and intra-articular (marked by "I"), involving the first carpometacarpal joint, subsequent number increases with severity.

Extra-articular (E)

- E1 - Transverse fracture
- E2 - Oblique or spiral fracture
- E3 - Comminuted fracture

Intra-articular (I)

- I1 - Simple intra-articular fracture with main palmar-ulnar fragment (Bennett's fracture)
- I2 - "Y" or "T" shaped intra-articular fracture (Rolando's fracture)
- I3 - Comminuted intra-articular fracture

== Additional images ==
First metacarpal bone of the left hand (shown in red). Animation.

First metacarpal bone of the left hand. Close up.

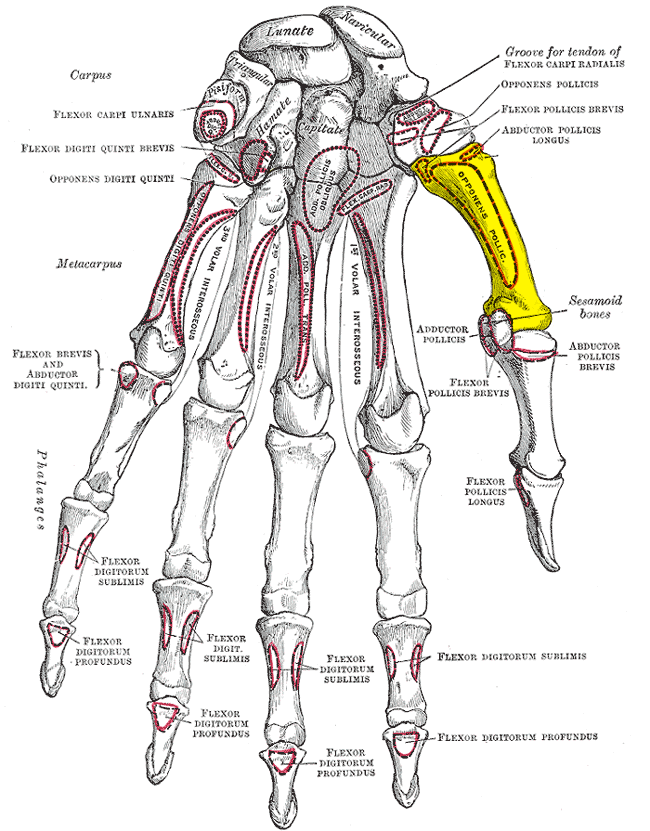
Palmar view of the left hand (first metacarpal shown in yellow).

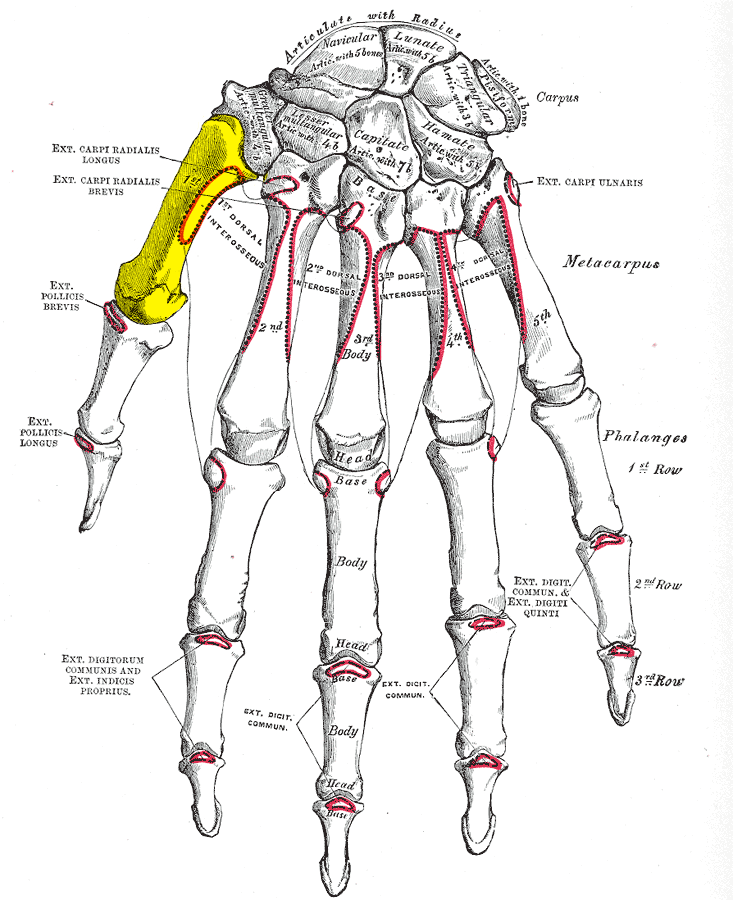
Dorsal view of the left hand (first metacarpal shown in yellow).

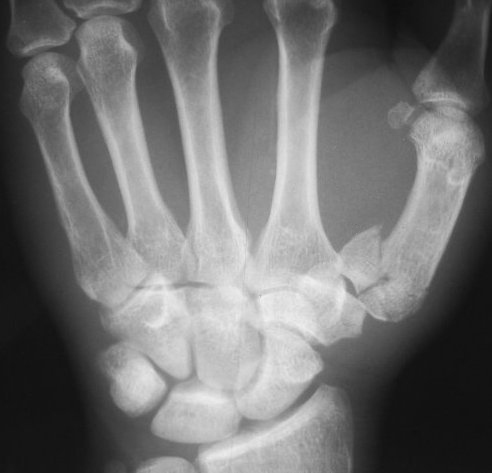
Fracture of the first metacarpal (Rolando's fracture).

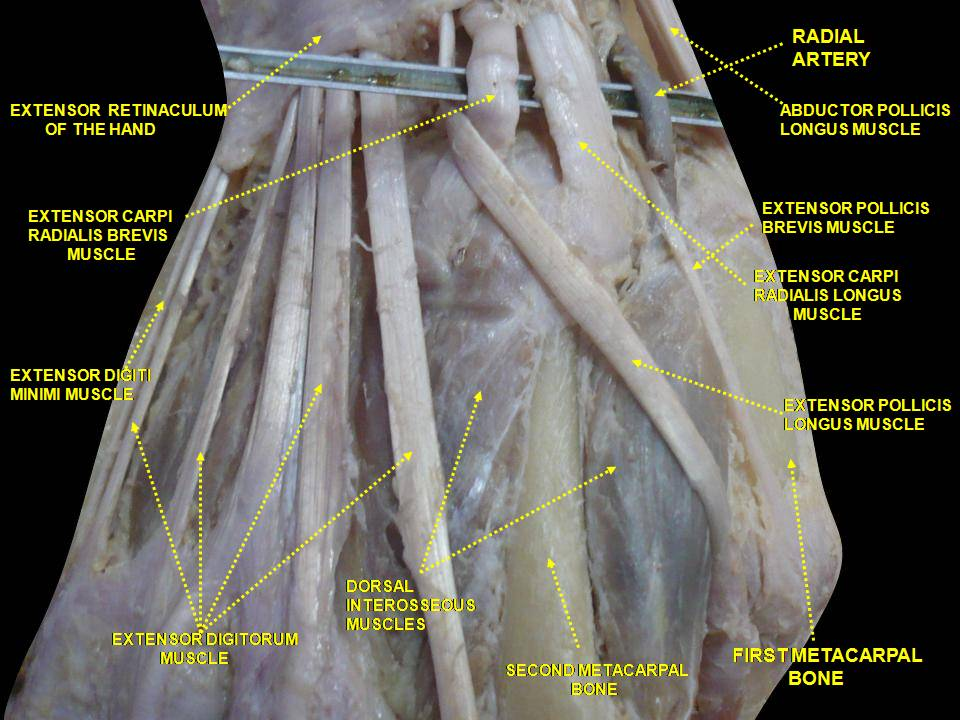
First metacarpal bone. Deep dissection.
