= Rolando fracture =

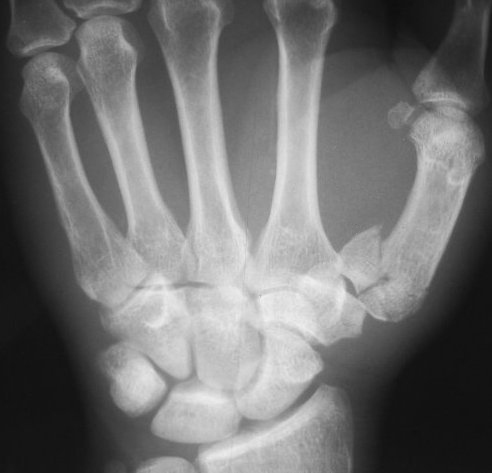
- Complete break at base of thumb
- Specialty: Hand surgery

The Rolando fracture is a type of broken finger involving the base of the thumb.According to the Metacalamity classification, it is categorized as "I2".

It is an intra-articular fracture.

It was first described in 1910 by Silvio Rolando. It is typically T- or Y-shaped.

== Treatment ==
There are several proposed methods of treatment. The quality of reduction does not correlate with late symptoms and osteoarthritic changes. Despite this fact, the joint surface should be restored as close to its anatomical position as possible. Some advocate fixation with Kirschner wires, or plate and screw constructions. Another accepted treatment is an external fixator accompanied by the tension band wiring technique.

Tension band wiring is a technique in which the bone fragments are transfixed by Kirschner wires, which are then also used as an anchor for a loop of flexible wire. As the loop is tightened the bone fragments are compressed together.

== Prognosis ==
The Rolando fracture is less common than the Bennett's fracture, and is associated with a worse prognosis.

== History ==
It was first described in 1910 by Silvio Rolando.

== See also ==
- Bennett's fracture
- Boxer's fracture
- Gamekeeper's thumb
