= Abductor pollicis longus muscle =

Muscle in the forearm moving the thumb

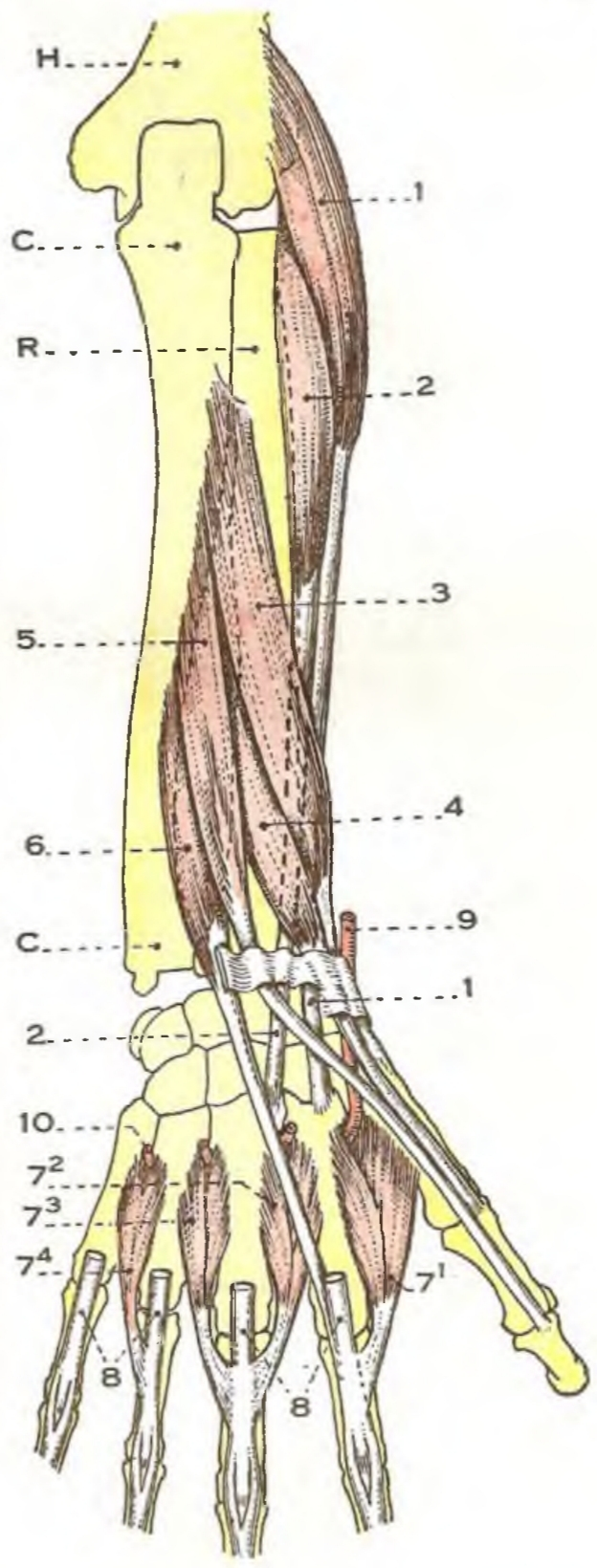
- Deep muscles of posterior surface of the right forearm and hand. The abductor pollicis longus is labeled 3. (After Testut's Anatomy.)

Details
- Origin: Ulna, radius, Interosseous membrane
- Insertion: Base of 1st metacarpal
- Artery: Posterior interosseous artery
- Nerve: Radial nerve C8, T1
- Actions: Abduction, extension of thumb
- Antagonist: Adductor pollicis muscle

Identifiers
- Latin: musculus abductor pollicis longus
- TA98: A04.6.02.049
- TA2: 2517
- FMA: 38515

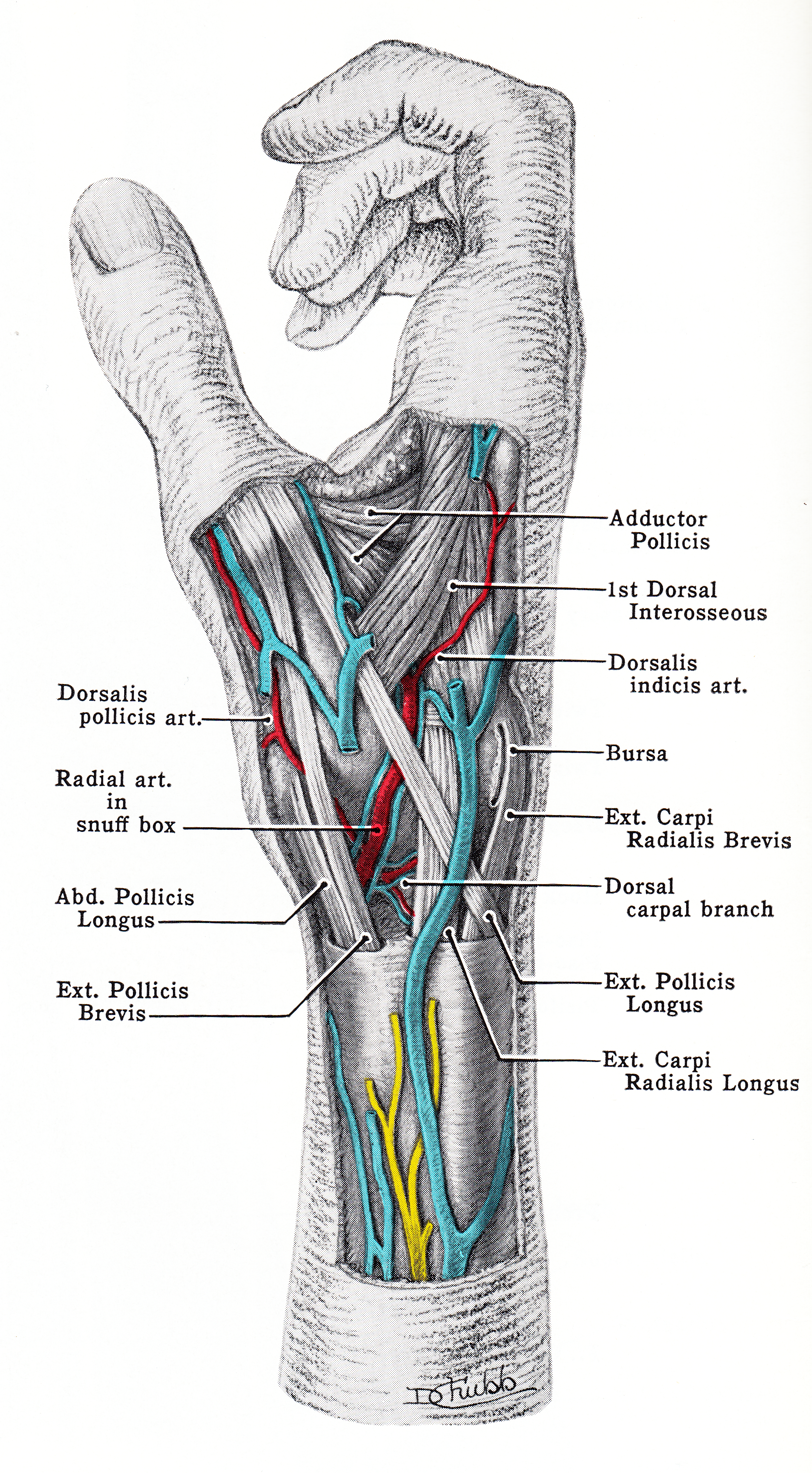
United tendons of the abductor pollicis longus and extensor pollicis brevis at the anatomical snuffbox

In human anatomy, the abductor pollicis longus (APL) is one of the extrinsic muscles of the hand. Its major function is to abduct the thumb at the wrist. Its tendon forms the anterior border of the anatomical snuffbox.

== Structure ==
The abductor pollicis longus lies immediately below the supinator and is sometimes united with it. It arises from the lateral part of the dorsal surface of the body of the ulna, below the insertion of the anconeus, from the interosseous membrane, and from the middle third of the dorsal surface of the body of the radius.

Passing obliquely downward and lateralward, it ends in a tendon, which runs through a groove on the lateral side of the lower end of the radius, accompanied by the tendon of the extensor pollicis brevis.

The insertion is divided into a distal, superficial part and a proximal, deep part. The superficial part is inserted with one or more tendons into the radial side of the base of the first metacarpal bone, and the deep part is variably inserted into the trapezium, the joint capsule and its ligaments, and into the belly of abductor pollicis brevis (APB) or opponens pollicis.

=== Innervation ===
The abductor pollicis longus muscle is innervated by the posterior interosseous nerve, which is a continuation of the deep branch of the radial nerve after it passes through the supinator muscle. Abductor pollicis longus lies close to the radial nerve. The posterior interosseous nerve is derived from spinal segments C7 & C8.

=== Blood supply ===
Abductor pollicis longus is supplied by the posterior interosseous artery.

=== Variation ===
An accessory abductor pollicis longus (AAPL) tendon is present in more than 80% of people, and a separate muscle belly is present in 20% of people. In one study, the accessory tendon was inserted into the trapezium (41%); proximally on the abductor pollicis brevis (22%) and opponens pollicis brevis (5%); had a double insertion on the trapezium and thenar muscles (15%); or the base of the first metacarpal (1%). Up to seven tendons have been reported in rare cases.

Multiple APL tendons can be regarded as a functional advantage since injured tendons can be compensated by the healthy ones.

== Function ==
The chief action of abductor pollicis longus is to abduct the thumb at the carpometacarpal joint, thereby moving the thumb anteriorly. It also assists in extending and rotating the thumb.

By its continued action, it helps to abduct the wrist (radial deviation) and flex the hand.

The APL insertion on the trapezium and the APB origin on the same bone is the only connection between the thumb's intrinsic and extrinsic muscles. (Note: The extrinsic thumb muscles are those originating in the forearm: extensor pollicis longus, extensor pollicis brevis, flexor pollicis longus, and abductor pollicis longus. The intrinsic thumbs muscles originates in the hand: opponens pollicis, flexor pollicis brevis, adductor pollicis and abductor pollicis brevis.) As the thumb is brought into action, these two muscles must coordinate to keep the trapezium stable in the carpus, which is important for the proper functioning of the thumb (i.e. precision and power grip.)

== In other animals ==
The only primates to have an APL completely separated from the extensor pollicis brevis are modern humans and gibbons. In gibbons, however, the APL originates proximally on the radius and ulna, whereas it originates in the middle part of these bones in crab-eating monkeys, bonobos, and humans. In all these primates, the muscle is inserted onto the base of the first metacarpal and sometimes onto the trapezium (siamangs and bonobos) and thumb sesamoids (crab-eating monkeys).

In chimpanzees, the APL flexes the thumb rather than extending it like in modern humans. Compared to the wrists of chimpanzees, the human wrist is derived (compared to the Pan-Homo LCA) in having considerably longer muscle moment arms for a range of hand muscles. It is possible that these differences are due to the supinated position of the trapezium in humans which, in its turn, is a result of the expansion of the trapezoid on the side of the palm.

A small, lens-shaped radial sesamoid embedded into the APL tendon is a primitive state found in all known Carnivora genera except in the red and giant pandas and the extinct Simocyon where it is hypertrophied (enlarged) into a sixth digit or a so-called "false thumb", a derived trait that first appeared in ursids. The APL sesamoid is present in all non-human primates, but only in about half of gorillas, and normally absent in humans.

== Gallery ==
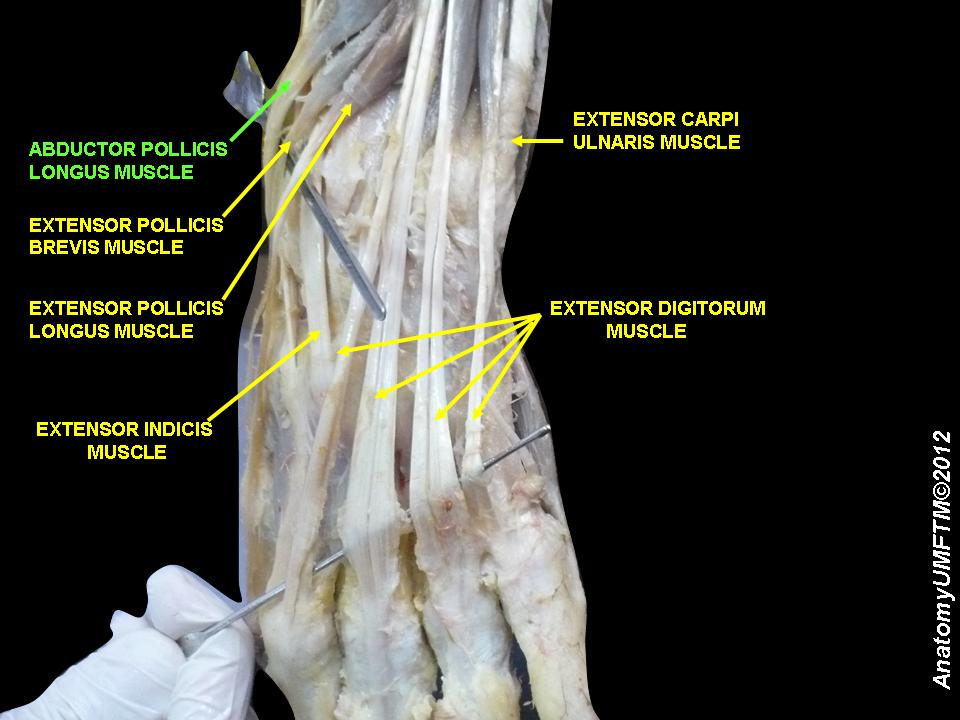
Abductor pollicis longus muscle

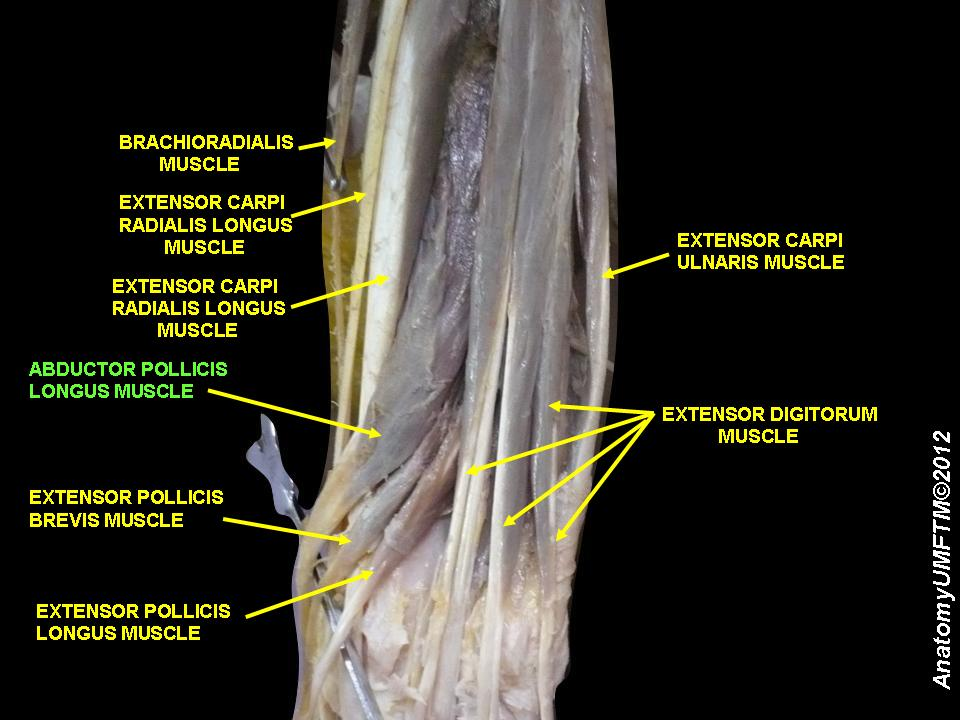
Abductor pollicis longus muscle

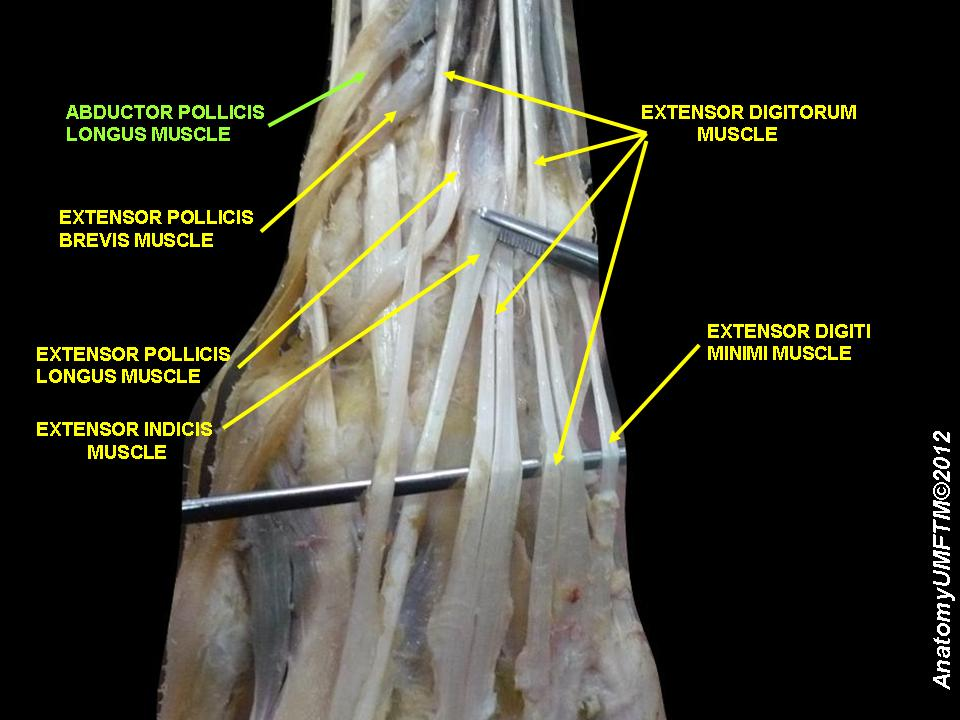
Abductor pollicis longus muscle

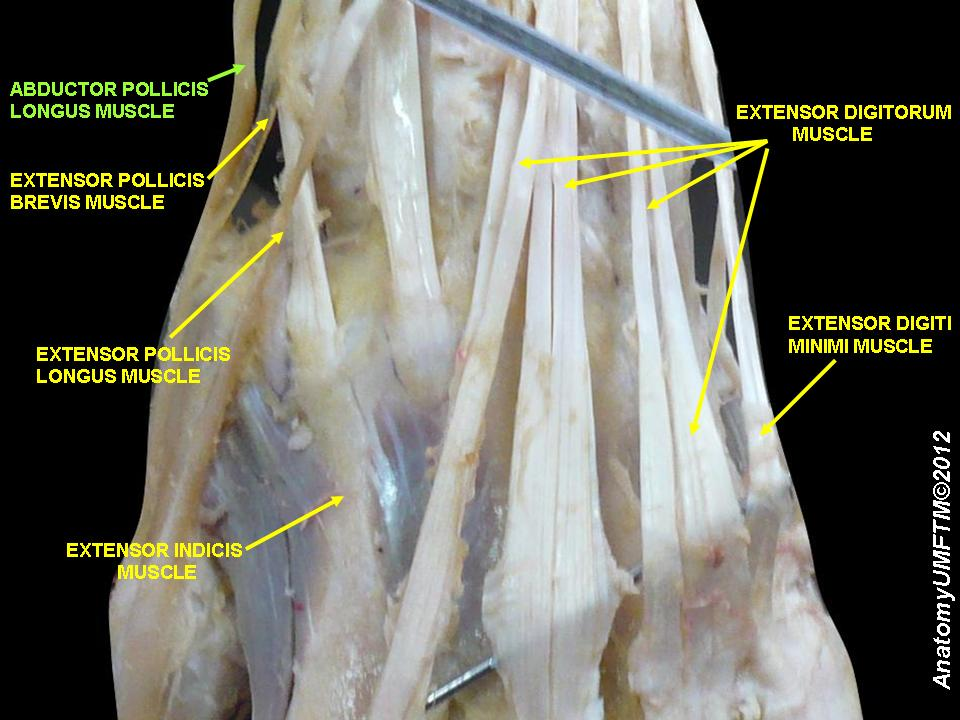
Abductor pollicis longus muscle

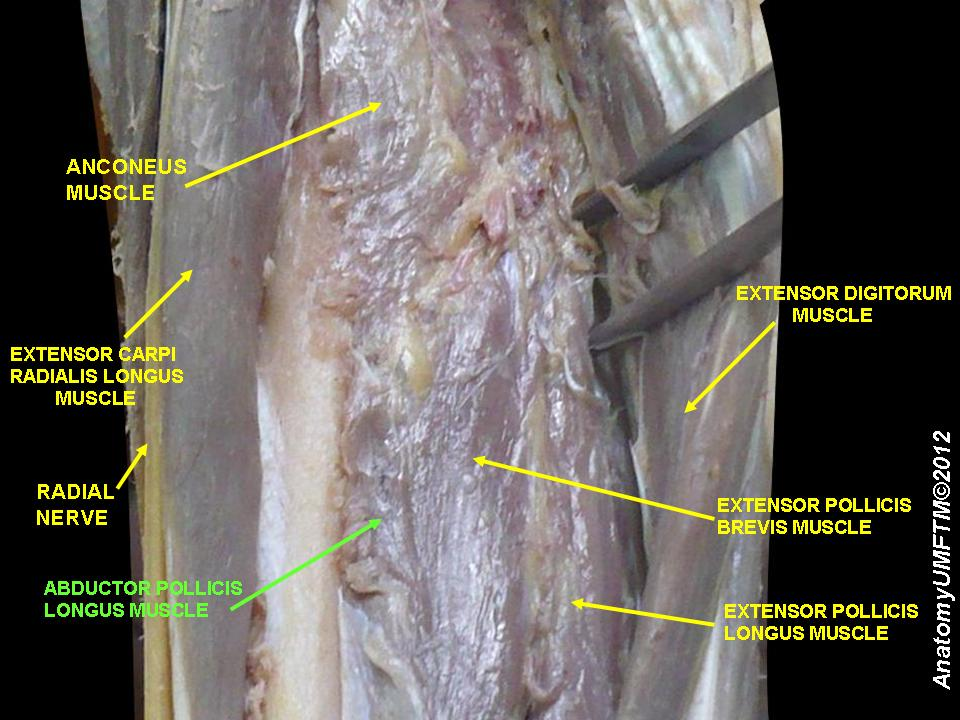
Abductor pollicis longus muscle

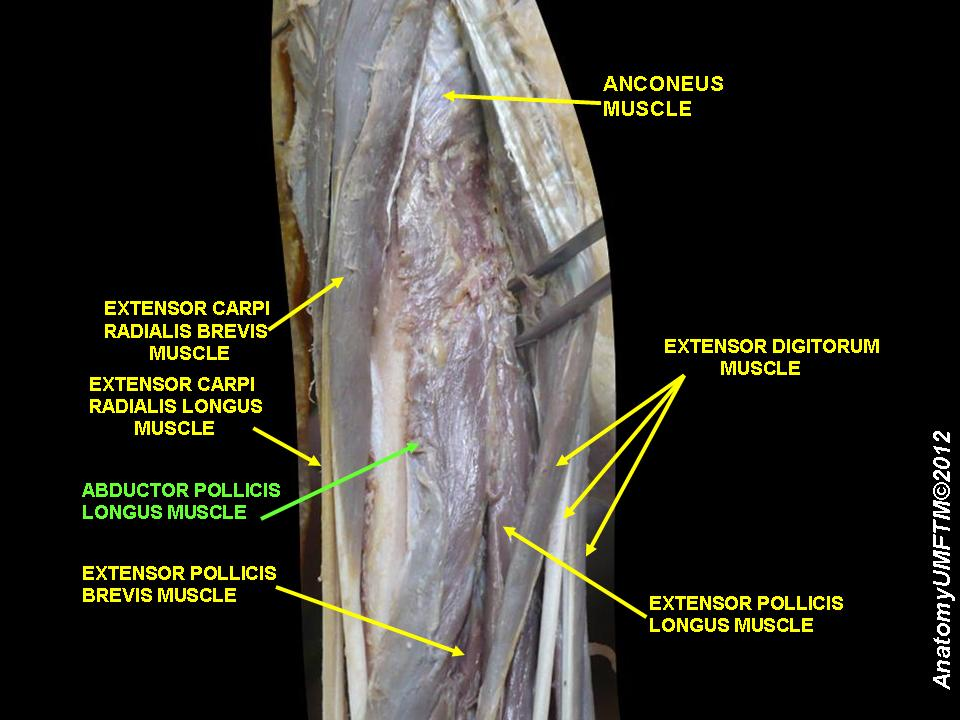
Abductor pollicis longus muscle

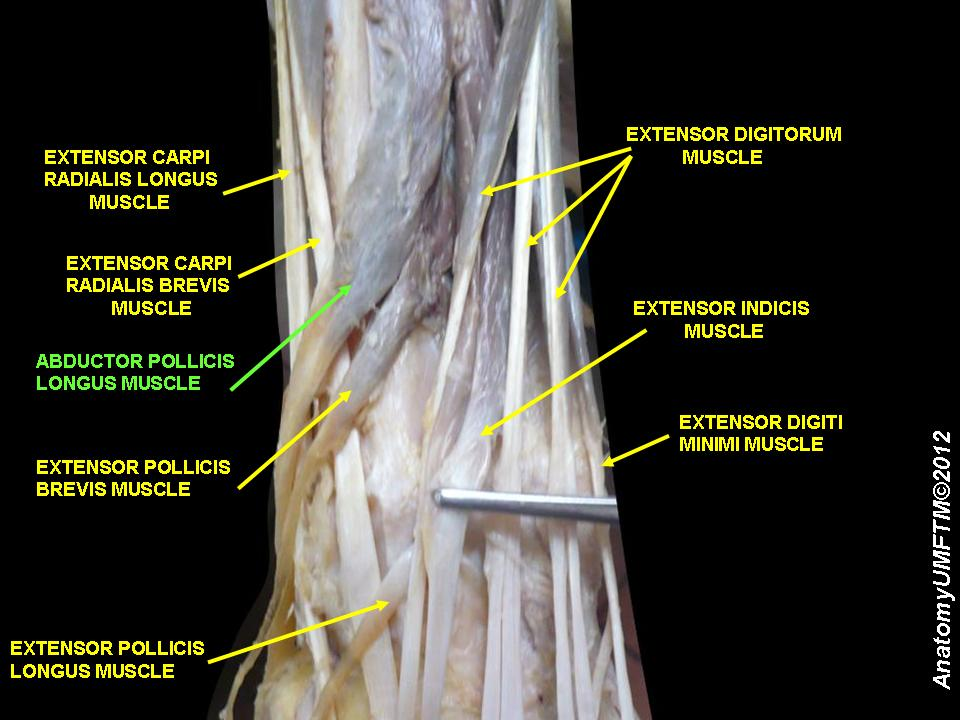
Abductor pollicis longus muscle

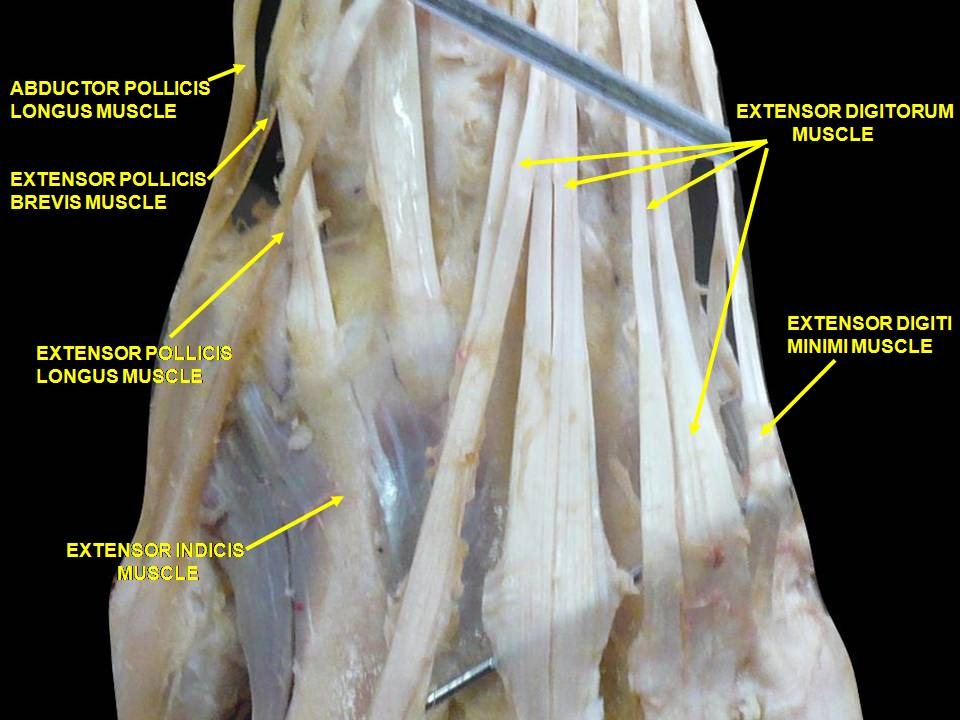
Muscle of the hand. Posterior view.

== See also ==
- Extensor pollicis longus
- De Quervain syndrome
- Bennett's fracture
