= Joints of hand =

Anatomical structures

Joints in the hand
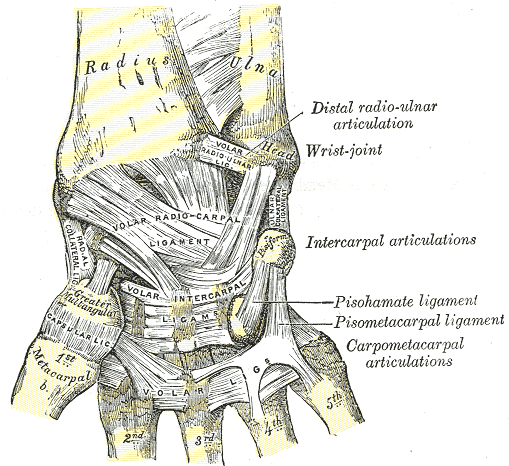
- Ligaments of wrist. Anterior view

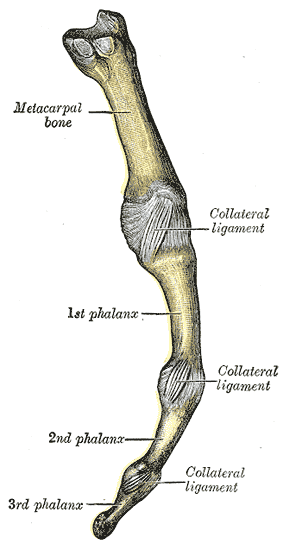
- Metacarpophalangeal articulation and articulations of digit. Ulnar aspect.

Details

Identifiers
- Latin: articulationes manus
- MeSH: D050823
- TA98: A03.5.11.001
- TA2: 1802

The joints in the hand are joints found at the distal end of the upper limb.

The joints are:

- In the wrist there is the radiocarpal joint between the radius and carpus. Between the carpal bones are the intercarpal articulations and the midcarpal joint.
- The carpometacarpal joint connects the carpal bones to the metacarpus or metacarpal bones which are joined at the intermetacarpal articulations.
- In the fingers, finally, are the metacarpophalangeal joints (including the knuckles) between the metacarpal bones and the phalanges or finger bones which are interconnected by the interphalangeal joints.
