= Pisiform joint =

Joint of the hand

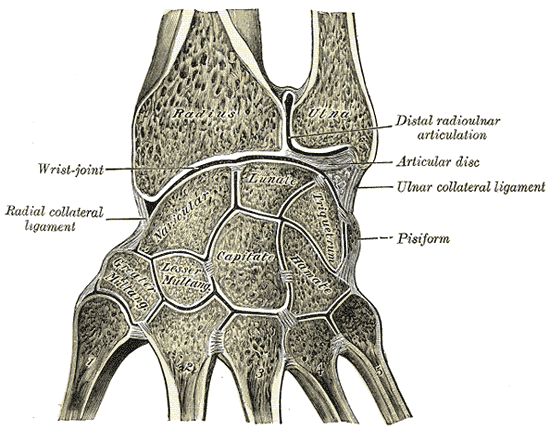
- Vertical section through the articulations at the wrist, showing the synovial cavities.

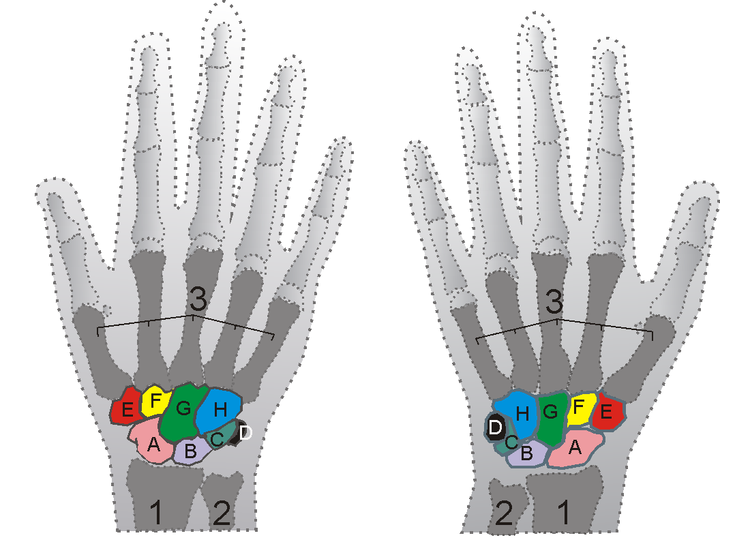
- Shown is the right hand, palm down (left) and palm up (right). Proximal: A=Scaphoid, B=Lunate, C=Triquetral, D=Pisiform; Distal: E=Trapezium, F=Trapezoid, G=Capitate, H=Hamate

Details

Identifiers
- Latin: articulatio ossis pisiformis
- TA98: A03.5.11.107
- TA2: 1824
- FMA: 73126

The pisiform joint is a joint between the pisiform and triquetrum.

It includes the pisohamate ligament and pisometacarpal ligament.
