= Intercarpal joints =

Joints of the carpal bones of the wrist

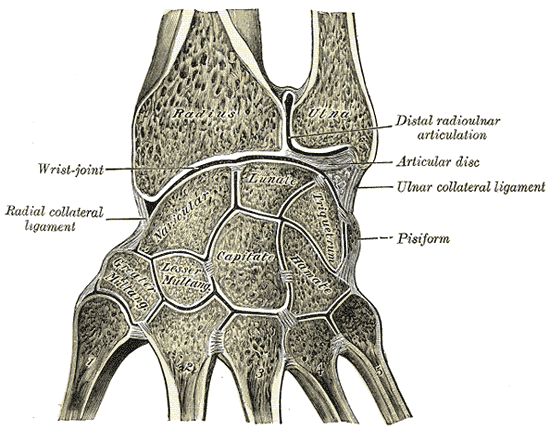
- Vertical section through the joints at the wrist, showing the synovial cavities.

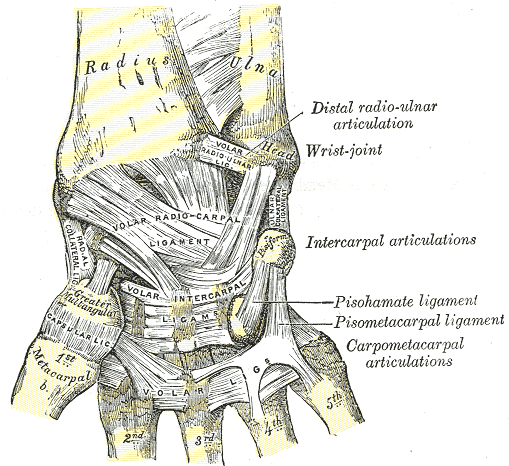
- Ligaments of wrist. Anterior view

Details

Identifiers
- Latin: articulationes intercarpeae
- MeSH: D050824
- TA98: A03.5.11.101
- TA2: 1803
- FMA: 71361

The intercarpal joints (joints of the carpal bones of the wrist) can be subdivided into three sets of joints (also called articulations): Those of the proximal row of carpal bones, those of the distal row of carpal bones, and those of the two rows with each other.

== Articulations ==
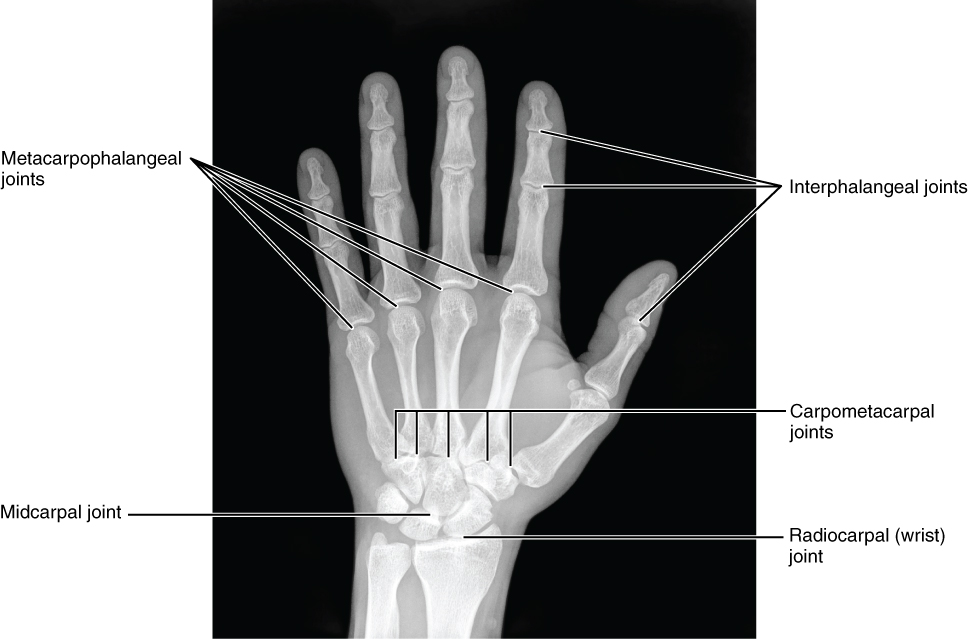
Joints of the hand, X-ray

The bones in each carpal row interlock with each other and each row can therefore be considered a single joint. In the proximal row a limited degree of mobility is possible, but the bones of the distal row are connected to each other and to the metacarpal bones by strong ligaments that make this row and the metacarpus a functional entity.

=== Proximal row ===
The joints of the proximal row are arthrodial joints, The scaphoid, lunate, and triquetrum are connected by dorsal, volar, and interosseous ligaments.

The dorsal intercarpal ligament are two in number and placed transversely behind the bones of the first row; they connect the scaphoid and lunate, and the lunate and triquetrum.

The palmar intercarpal ligaments are also two, connect the scaphoid and lunate, and the lunate and triangular; they are less strong than the dorsal, and placed very deeply behind the Flexor tendons and the volar radiocarpal ligament.

The interosseous intercarpal ligaments are two narrow bundles, one connecting the lunate with the scaphoid, the other joining it to the triangular. They are on a level with the superior surfaces of these bones, and their upper surfaces are smooth, and form part of the convex articular surface of the wrist-joint.

The ligaments connecting the pisiform bone are the articular capsule and the two volar ligaments. The articular capsule is a thin membrane which connects the pisiform to the triangular; it is lined by synovial membrane.

The two volar ligaments are strong fibrous bands; one, the pisohamate ligament, connects the pisiform to the hamate, the other, the pisometacarpal ligament, joins the pisiform to the base of the fifth metacarpal bone. These ligaments are, in reality, prolongations of the tendon of the Flexor carpi ulnaris.

=== Distal row ===
These joints are also arthrodial joints connected by dorsal, volar, and interosseous ligaments.

The dorsal ligaments are three in number, extend transversely from one bone to another on the dorsal surface, connecting the greater with the lesser multangular, the lesser multangular with the capitate, and the capitate with the hamate.

The volar ligaments are also three and have a similar arrangement on the volar surface.

The three interosseous ligaments are much thicker than those of the first row; one is placed between the capitate and the hamate, a second between the capitate and the lesser multangular, and a third between the greater and lesser multangulars. The first is much the strongest, and the third is sometimes wanting.

=== Midcarpal ===
See Midcarpal joint

== Synovial membrane ==
The synovial membrane of the carpus is very extensive, and bounds a synovial cavity of very irregular shape.

The upper portion of the cavity intervenes between the under surfaces of the navicular, lunate, and triangular bones and the upper surfaces of the bones of the second row.

It sends two prolongations upward—between the navicular and lunate, and the lunate and triangular—and three prolongations downward between the four bones of the second row.

The prolongation between the greater and lesser multangulars, or that between the lesser multangular and capitate, is, owing to the absence of the interosseous ligament, often continuous with the cavity of the carpometacarpal joints, sometimes of the second, third, fourth, and fifth metacarpal bones, sometimes of the second and third only.

In the latter condition the joint between the hamate and the fourth and fifth metacarpal bones has a separate synovial membrane.

The synovial cavities of these joints are prolonged for a short distance between the bases of the metacarpal bones.

There is a separate synovial membrane between the pisiform and triangular.

== Movements ==
The articulation of the hand and wrist considered as a whole involves four articular surfaces:

- (a) the inferior surfaces of the radius and articular disk;
- (b) the superior surfaces of the scaphoid, lunate, and triangular, the pisiform having no essential part in the movement of the hand;
- (c) the S-shaped surface formed by the inferior surfaces of the scaphoid, lunate, and triangular;
- (d) the reciprocal surface formed by the upper surfaces of the bones of the second row.

These four surfaces form two joints: (1) a proximal, the wrist-joint proper; and (2) a distal, the mid-carpal joint.

=== Mid-carpal joint ===
See Midcarpal joint
