= Intercarpal ligament =

Intercarpal ligament may refer to:

- Dorsal intercarpal ligament
- Interosseous intercarpal ligaments
- Palmar intercarpal ligaments
