= Carpometacarpal ligaments =

Carpometacarpal ligaments may refer to:

- Dorsal carpometacarpal ligaments, the strongest and most distinct carpometacarpal ligaments, connect the carpal and metacarpal bones on their dorsal side
- Palmar carpometacarpal ligaments, a series of bands on the palmar surface of the carpometacarpal joints that connect the carpal bones
- Posterior carpometacarpal ligament, consists of a series of bands on the posterior surface of the carpometacarpal joints
