= Dorsal radiocarpal ligament =

Ligament of the wrist

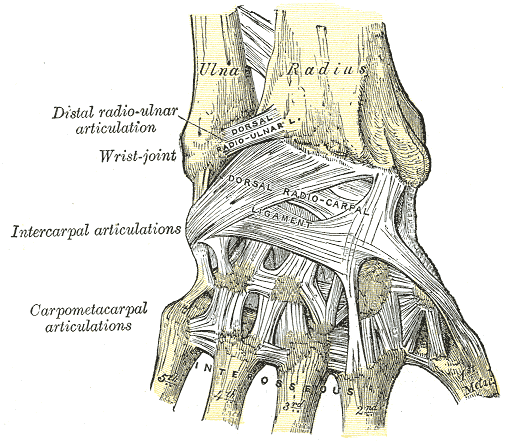
- Ligaments of wrist. Posterior view. (Dorsal radio-carpal ligament visible at center.)

Details
- From: Radius
- To: Proximal carpals

Identifiers
- Latin: ligamentum radiocarpeum dorsale
- TA98: A03.5.11.003
- TA2: 1787
- FMA: 40001

The dorsal radiocarpal ligament (posterior ligament) is less thick and strong than its volar counterpart, and has a proximal attachment to the posterior border of the distal radius. Its fibers run medially and inferiorly to form a distal attachment at the dorsal surfaces of the scaphoid (navicular bone of the hand), lunate, and triquetral.

The fibres of the dorsal radiocarpal ligament blend with those of the dorsal intercarpal ligament.

It is in relation, behind, with the Extensor tendons of the fingers; in front, it is blended with the articular disk.
