= Posterior carpometacarpal ligament =

Ligament of the wrist

Details
- From: carpal
- To: metacarpal

Identifiers
- Latin: ligamenta carpometacarpalia dorsalia

The posterior carpometacarpal ligament consists of a series of bands on the posterior surface of the carpometacarpal joints. They connect the carpal bones to the bases of the second to fifth metacarpals. The second metacarpal bone is connected to the trapezium, trapezoid, and capitate. The third metacarpal is connected to the capitate. The fourth metacarpal is connected to the capitate and hamate, and the fifth metacarpal is connected to the hamate.
