= Midcarpal joint =

Joint of the hand

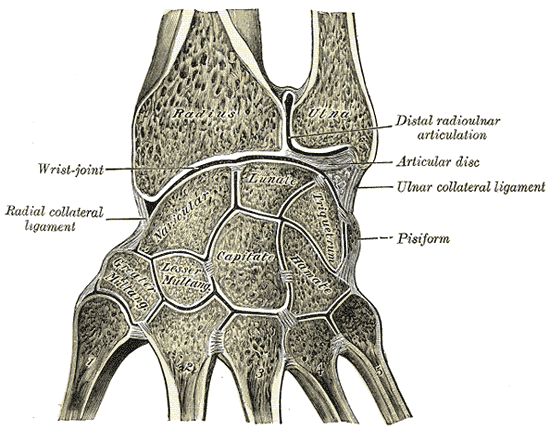
- Vertical section through the articulations at the wrist, showing the synovial cavities.

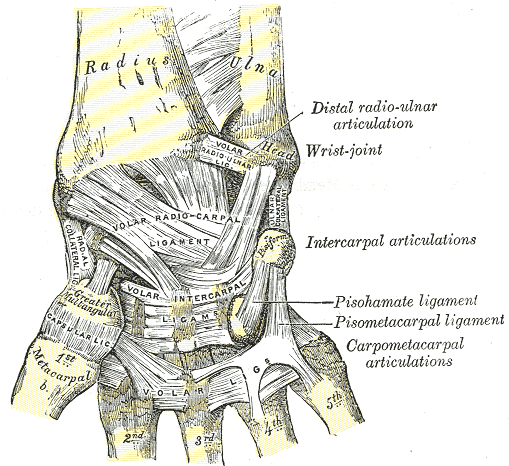
- Ligaments of wrist. Anterior view

Details

Identifiers
- Latin: articulatio mediocarpalis
- TA98: A03.5.11.102
- TA2: 1804
- FMA: 35293

The midcarpal joint is formed by the scaphoid, lunate, and triquetral bones in the proximal row, and the trapezium, trapezoid, capitate, and hamate bones in the distal row. The distal pole of the scaphoid articulates with two trapezial bones as a gliding type of joint. The proximal end of the scaphoid combines with the lunate and triquetrum to form a deep concavity that articulates with the convexity of the combined capitate and hamate in a form of diarthrodial, almost condyloid joint.

== Description ==
The cavity of the midcarpal joint is very extensive and irregular. The major portion of the cavity is located between the distal surfaces of the scaphoid, lunate, and triquetrum and proximal surfaces of the four bones of the distal row. Proximal prolongations of the cavity occur between the scaphoid and lunate and between the lunate and triquetrum. These extensions reach almost to the proximal surface of the bones in the proximal row and are separated from the cavity of the radiocarpal joint by the thin interosseous ligaments. There are three distal prolongations of the midcarpal joint cavity between the four bones of the distal row. The joint space between trapezium and trapezoid, or that between trapezoid and capitate, may communicate with cavities of the carpometacarpal joints, most commonly the second and third. The cavity between the first metacarpal and carpus is always separate from the midcarpal joint; the joint cavity between the hamate and fourth and fifth metacarpals is a separate cavity more often than not, but it may communicate normally with the midcarpal joint.

== The Wrist ==
The wrist is perhaps the most complicated joint in the body. It permits movements in two planes - extension/flexion, ulnar deviation/radial deviation - and allows complex patterns of motion under significant strain.

Optimal wrist function requires stability of the carpal components in all joint positions under static and dynamic conditions.

Stability is achieved by a sophisticated geometry of articular surfaces and intricate system of ligaments, retinacula, and tendons, which also determine the relative motion of the carpal bones.

== Ligaments ==
Ligamentous Apparatus of the Wrist

The carpal bones are not interlocked solely by their shapes; rather, they are held together by interosseous ligaments and by volar, dorsal, radial, and ulnar ligaments. The ligaments holding the carpal bones to each other, to the distal radius and ulna, and to the proximal ends of the metacarpals can be described as extrinsic, or capsular, and intrinsic, or interosseous (intercarpal). The function of the ligamentous system is guiding and constraining certain patterns of motion. Some portion of the ligaments are under tension in every position of the hand in relation to the forearm.
