= Carpal bones =

Eight bones that make up the wrist

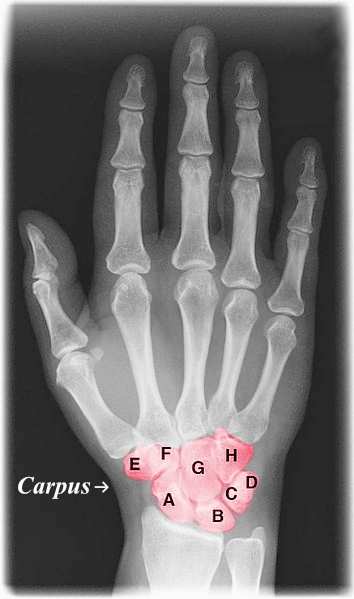

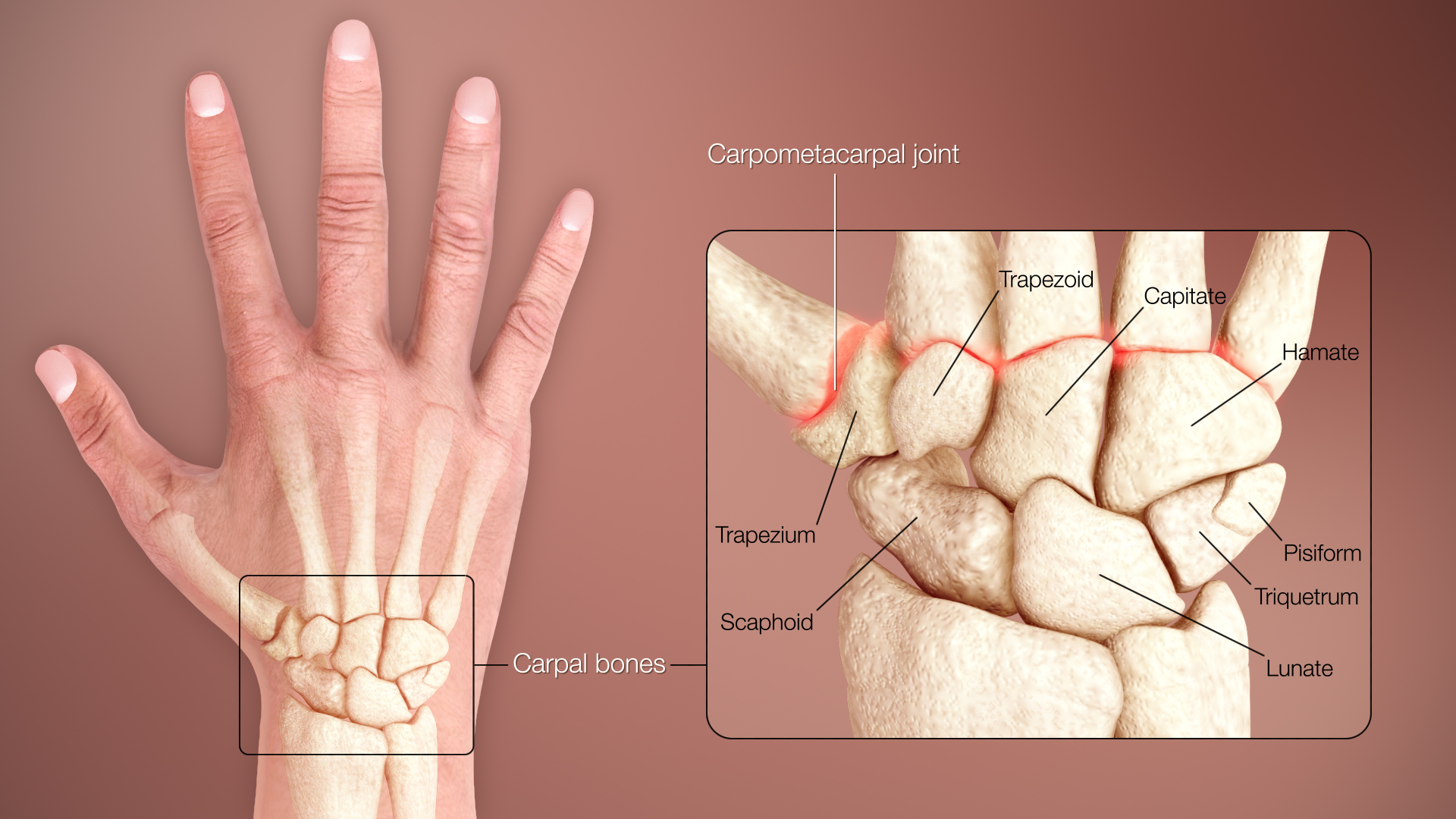
- Labelled image showing the eight carpal bones.

Details

Identifiers
- Latin: os carpale pl. ossa carpi
- MeSH: D002348
- TA98: A02.4.08.001
- TA2: 1249
- FMA: 23889

The carpal bones are the eight small bones that make up the wrist (carpus) that connects the hand to the forearm. The terms "carpus" and "carpal" are derived from the Latin carpus and the Greek καρπός (karpós), meaning "wrist". In human anatomy, the main role of the carpal bones is to articulate with the radial and ulnar heads to form a highly mobile condyloid joint (i.e. wrist joint), to provide attachments for thenar and hypothenar muscles, and to form part of the rigid carpal tunnel which allows the median nerve and tendons of the anterior forearm muscles to be transmitted to the hand and fingers.

In tetrapods, the carpus is the sole cluster of bones in the wrist between the radius and ulna and the metacarpus. The bones of the carpus do not belong to individual fingers (or toes in quadrupeds), whereas those of the metacarpus do. The corresponding part of the foot is the tarsus. The carpal bones allow the wrist to move and rotate vertically.

== Structure ==
=== Bones ===
The eight carpal bones may be conceptually organized as either two transverse rows, or three longitudinal columns.

When considered as paired rows, each row forms an arch which is convex proximally and concave distally. On the palmar side, the carpus is concave and forms the carpal tunnel, which is covered by the flexor retinaculum. The proximal row comprises the scaphoid, lunate, triquetral, and pisiform bones which articulate with the surfaces of the radius and distal carpal row, and thus constantly adapts to these mobile surfaces. Within the proximal row, each carpal bone has slight independent mobility. For example, the scaphoid contributes to midcarpal stability by articulating distally with the trapezium and the trapezoid. In contrast, the distal row is more rigid as its transverse arch moves with the metacarpals.

Biomechanically and clinically, the carpal bones are better conceptualized as three longitudinal columns:

1. Radial scaphoid column: scaphoid, trapezium, and trapezoid
2. Lunate column: lunate and capitate
3. Ulnar triquetral column: triquetrum and hamate

In this context the pisiform is regarded as a sesamoid bone embedded in the tendon of the flexor carpi ulnaris. The ulnar column leaves a gap between the ulna and the triquetrum, and therefore, only the radial or scaphoid and central or capitate columns articulate with the radius. The wrist is more stable in flexion than in extension, mainly because of the strength of various capsules and ligaments than the interlocking parts of the skeleton.

Almost all carpals (except the pisiform) have six surfaces. Of these the palmar or anterior and the dorsal or posterior surfaces are rough, for ligamentous attachment; the dorsal surfaces being the broader, except in the lunate.

The superior or proximal, and inferior or distal surfaces are articular, the superior generally convex, the inferior concave; the medial and lateral surfaces are also articular where they are in contact with contiguous bones, otherwise they are rough and tuberculated.

The structure in all is similar: cancellous tissue enclosed in a layer of compact bone.

=== Joints ===
Carpal bones and their articulations. Carpal bones are shown in violet. Human left hand, anterior (palmar) view.

What each carpal bone joints to
| Name | Proximal/radial articulations | Lateral/medial articulations | Distal/metacarpal articulations |
Proximal row
| Scaphoid | radius | capitate, lunate | trapezium, trapezoid |
| Lunate | radius, articular disk | scaphoid, triquetral | capitate, hamate (sometimes) |
| Triquetrum | articular disk | lunate, pisiform | hamate |
| Pisiform | | triquetral | |
Distal row
| Trapezium | scaphoid | trapezoid | first and second metacarpal |
| Trapezoid | scaphoid | trapezium, capitate | second metacarpal |
| Capitate | scaphoid, lunate | trapezoid, hamate | third, partly second and fourth metacarpal |
| Hamate | triquetral, lunate | capitate | fourth and fifth |

=== Accessory bones ===
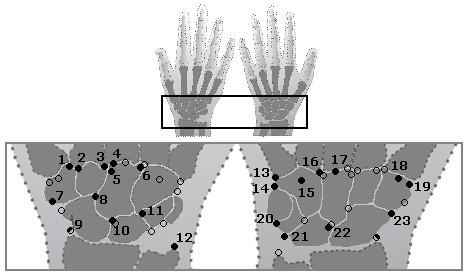
Location of the accessory ossicles of the carpals

Occasionally accessory bones are found in the carpus, but of more than 20 such described bones, only four (the central, styloid, secondary trapezoid, and secondary pisiform bones) are considered to be proven accessory bones. Sometimes the scaphoid, triquetrum, and pisiform bones are divided into two.

== Development ==
Appearance of ossification centers of carpal bones
| Bone | Average | Variation | Variation |
|---|---|---|---|
| Capitate | 2.5 months | 1–6 months | 1–5 months |
| Hamate | 4–5.5 months | 1–7 months | 1–12 months |
| Triquetrum | 2 years | 5 months to 3 years | 9 months to 4 years and 2 months |
| Lunate | 5 years | 2–5.5 years | 18 months to 4 years and 3 months |
| Trapezium | 6 years | 4–8 years | |
| Trapezoid | 6 years | 4–8 years | |
| Scaphoid | 6 years | 4–7 years | |
| Pisiform | 12 years | 8–12 years | |

The carpal bones are ossified endochondrally (from within the cartilage) and the ossific centers appear only after birth. The formation of these centers roughly follows a chronological spiral pattern starting in the capitate and hamate during the first year of life. The ulnar bones are then ossified before the radial bones, while the sesamoid pisiform arises in the tendon of the flexor carpi ulnaris after more than ten years. The commencement of ossification for each bone occurs over period like other bones. This is useful in forensic age estimation.

== Function ==
=== Ligaments ===
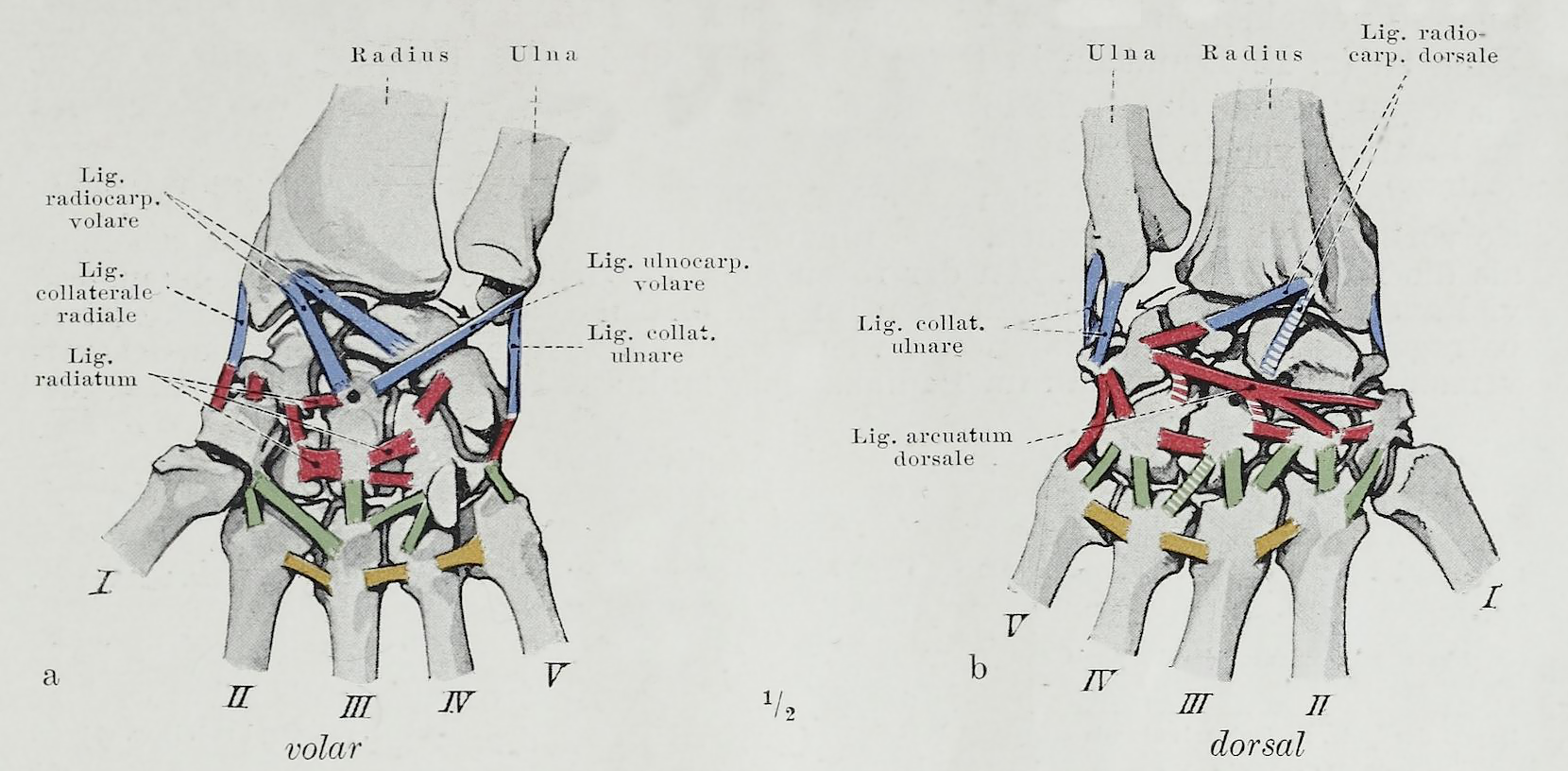
Four groups of ligaments in the region of the wrist (shown in four different colors.)

There are four groups of ligaments in the region of the wrist:

1. The ligaments of the wrist proper which unite the ulna and radius with the carpus: the ulnar and radial collateral ligaments; the palmar and dorsal radiocarpal ligaments; and the palmar ulnocarpal ligament. (Shown in blue in the figure.)
2. The ligaments of the intercarpal articulations which unite the carpal bones with one another: the radiate carpal ligament; the dorsal, palmar, and interosseous intercarpal ligaments; and the pisohamate ligament. (Shown in red in the figure.)
3. The ligaments of the carpometacarpal articulations which unite the carpal bones with the metacarpal bones: the pisometacarpal ligament and the palmar and dorsal carpometacarpal ligaments. (Shown in green in the figure.)
4. The ligaments of the intermetacarpal articulations which unite the metacarpal bones: the dorsal, interosseous, and palmar metacarpal ligaments. (Shown in yellow in the figure.)

=== Movements ===
The hand is said to be in straight position when the third finger runs over the capitate bone and is in a straight line with the forearm. This should not be confused with the midposition of the hand which corresponds to an ulnar deviation of 12 degrees. From the straight position two pairs of movements of the hand are possible: abduction (movement towards the radius, so called radial deviation or abduction) of 15 degrees and adduction (movement towards the ulna, so called ulnar deviation or adduction) of 40 degrees when the arm is in strict supination and slightly greater in strict pronation. Flexion (tilting towards the palm, so called palmar flexion) and extension (tilting towards the back of the hand, so called dorsiflexion) is possible with a total range of 170 degrees.

==== Radial abduction/ulnar adduction ====
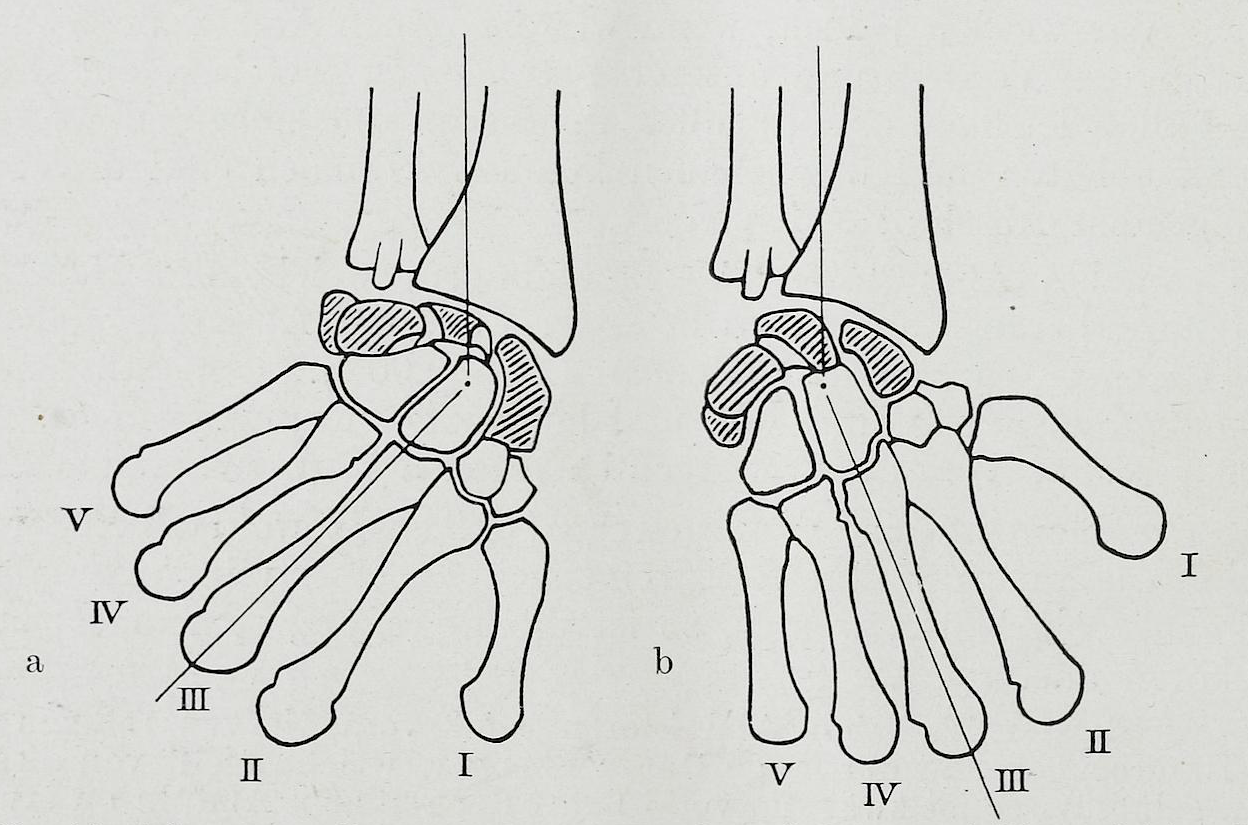
Left: Ulnar adduction Right: Radial abduction

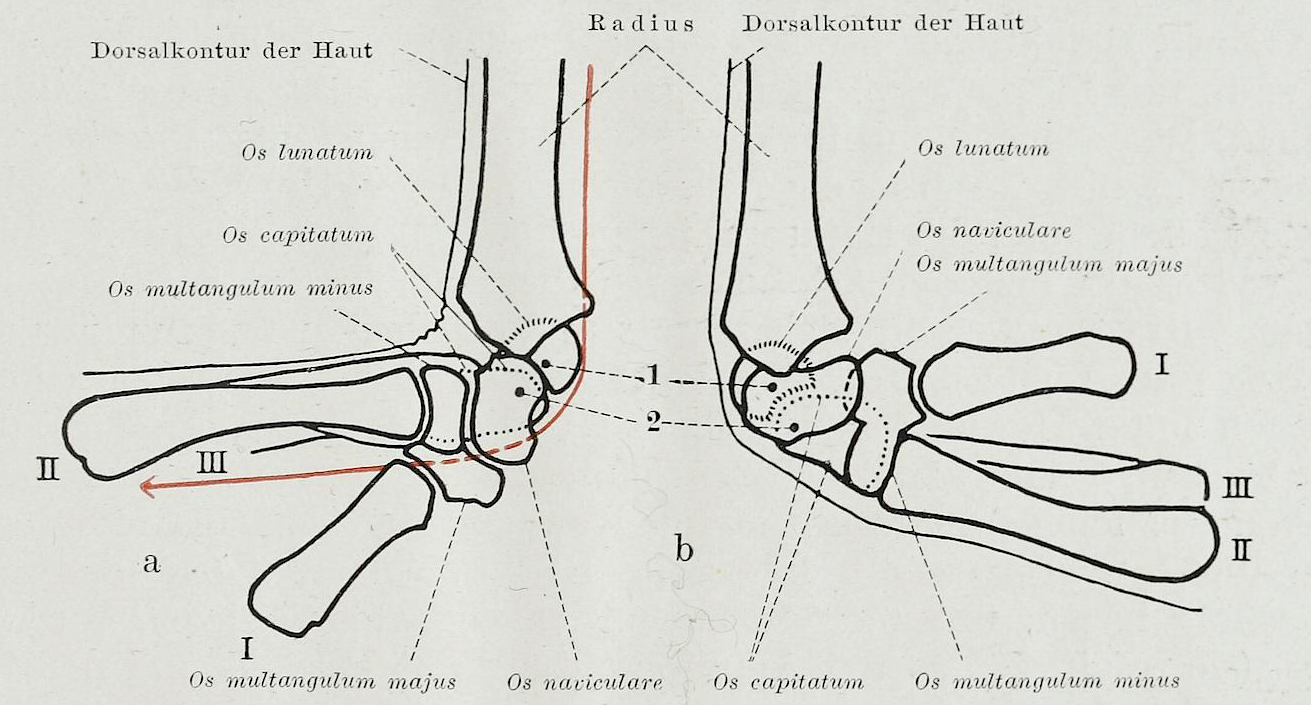
Left: Dorsiflexion Right: Palmar flexion

During radial abduction the scaphoid is tilted towards the palmar side which allows the trapezium and trapezoid to approach the radius. Because the trapezoid is rigidly attached to the second metacarpal bone to which also the flexor carpi radialis and extensor carpi radialis are attached, radial abduction effectively pulls this combined structure towards the radius. During radial abduction the pisiform traverses the greatest path of all carpal bones.

Radial abduction is produced by (in order of importance) extensor carpi radialis longus, abductor pollicis longus, extensor pollicis longus, flexor carpi radialis, and flexor pollicis longus.

Ulnar adduction causes a tilting or dorsal shifting of the proximal row of carpal bones. It is produced by extensor carpi ulnaris, flexor carpi ulnaris, extensor digitorum, and extensor digiti minimi.

Both radial abduction and ulnar adduction occurs around a dorsopalmar axis running through the head of the capitate bone.

==== Palmar flexion/dorsiflexion ====
During palmar flexion the proximal carpal bones are displaced towards the dorsal side and towards the palmar side during dorsiflexion. While flexion and extension consist of movements around a pair of transverse axes — passing through the lunate bone for the proximal row and through the capitate bone for the distal row — palmar flexion occurs mainly in the radiocarpal joint and dorsiflexion in the midcarpal joint.

Dorsiflexion is produced by (in order of importance) extensor digitorum, extensor carpi radialis longus, extensor carpi radialis brevis, extensor indicis, extensor pollicis longus, and extensor digiti minimi. Palmar flexion is produced by (in order of importance) flexor digitorum superficialis, flexor digitorum profundus, flexor carpi ulnaris, flexor pollicis longus, flexor carpi radialis, and abductor pollicis longus.

==== Combined movements ====
Combined with movements in both the elbow and shoulder joints, intermediate or combined movements in the wrist approximate those of a ball-and-socket joint with some necessary restrictions, such as maximum palmar flexion blocking abduction.

==== Accessory movements ====
Anteroposterior gliding movements between adjacent carpal bones or along the midcarpal joint can be achieved by stabilizing individual bones while moving another (i.e. gripping the bone between the thumb and index finger).

== Other animals ==
The structure of the carpus varies widely between different groups of tetrapods, even among those that retain the full set of five digits. In primitive fossil amphibians, such as Eryops, the carpus consists of three rows of bones; a proximal row of three carpals, a second row of four bones, and a distal row of five bones. The proximal carpals are referred to as the radiale, intermedium, and ulnare, after their proximal articulations, and are homologous with the scaphoid, lunate, and triquetral bones respectively. The remaining bones are simply numbered, as the first to fourth centralia (singular: centrale), and the first to fifth distal carpals. Primitively, each of the distal bones appears to have articulated with a single metacarpal.

However, the vast majority of later vertebrates, including modern amphibians, have undergone varying degrees of loss and fusion of these primitive bones, resulting in a smaller number of carpals. Almost all mammals and reptiles, for example, have lost the fifth distal carpal, and have only a single centrale - and even this is missing in humans. The pisiform bone is somewhat unusual, in that it first appears in primitive reptiles, and is never found in amphibians.

Because many tetrapods have fewer than five digits on the forelimb, even greater degrees of fusion are common, and a huge array of different possible combinations are found. The wing of a modern bird, for example, has only two remaining carpals; the radiale (the scaphoid of mammals) and a bone formed from the fusion of four of the distal carpals.

The carpus and tarsus are both described as podial elements or (clusters of) podial bones.

In some macropods, the scaphoid and lunar bones are fused into the scapholunar bone.

In crustaceans, "carpus" is the scientific term for the claws or "pincers" present on some legs. (See Decapod anatomy)

== Etymology ==
The Latin word "carpus" is derived from Greek καρπὁς meaning "wrist". The root "carp-" translates to "pluck", an action performed by the wrist.

== See also ==
- Carpal tunnel
- Carpal tunnel syndrome
- List of mnemonics
