= Multangular =

Multangular can refer to one of two bones:

- The Trapezoid (lesser multangular)
- The Trapezium (greater multangular)

See also

- The Multangular Tower, a Roman tower in York
