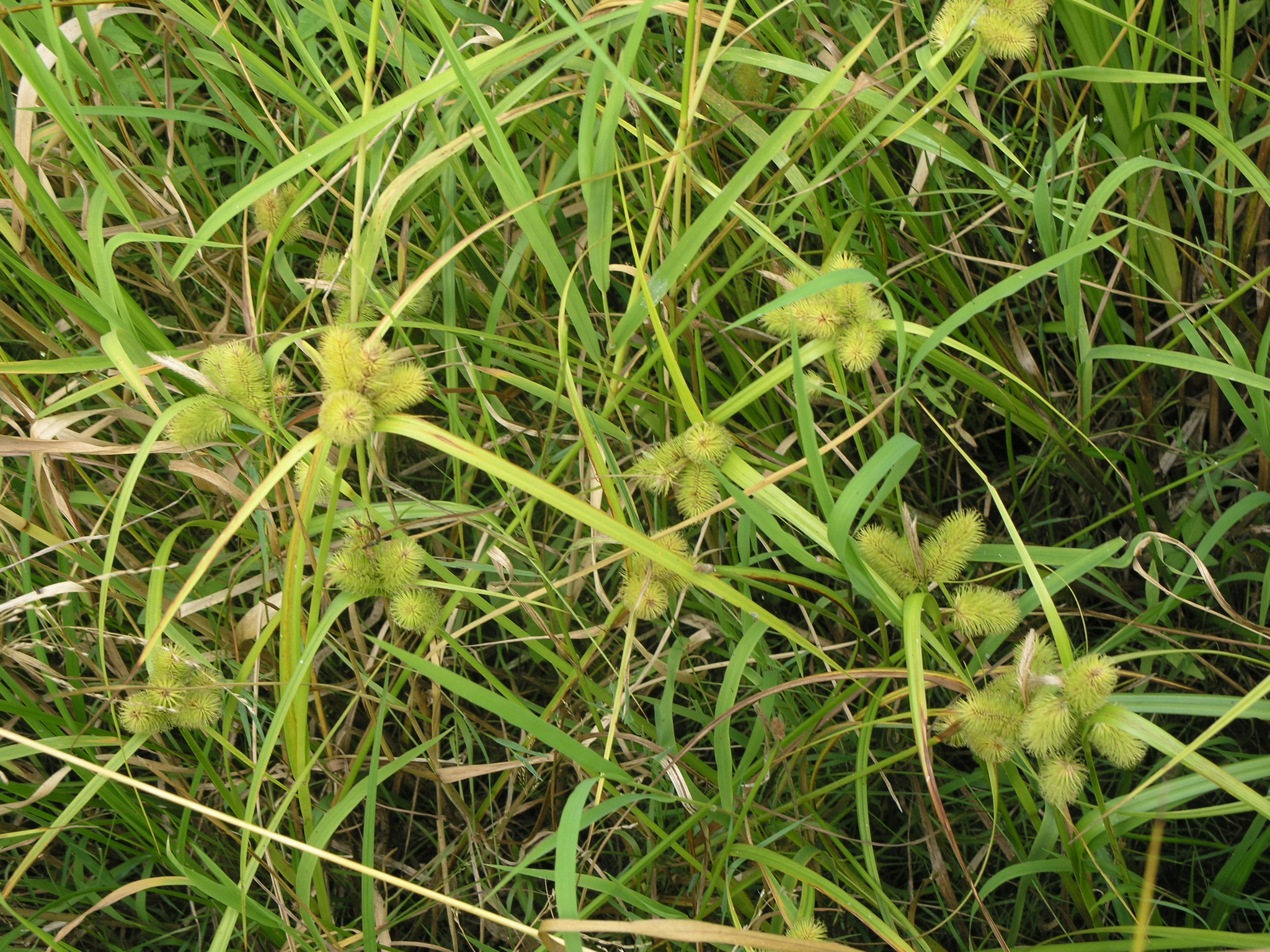

Scientific classification
- Kingdom: Plantae
- Clade: Tracheophytes
- Clade: Angiosperms
- Clade: Monocots
- Clade: Commelinids
- Order: Poales
- Family: Cyperaceae
- Genus: Carex
- Species: C. capricornis

Binomial name
- Carex capricornis Meinsh. ex. Maxim.

Synonyms
- Carex brachystachya (Regel & Maack) Akiyama; Carex pseudocyperus var. brachystachya Regel & Maack; Carex capricornis var. latifolia Honda

= Carex capricornis =

Species of grass-like plant

Carex capricornis, also known as capricornis sedge, is a sedge that is native to parts of Japan, Korea, eastern parts of China, Mongolia and south eastern parts of Russia.

== Description ==
The green sedge has a short rhizome and tufted culms that typically grow to a height of 3 to 70 cm (1.2 to 27.6 in). The culms are triquetrous in cross section and are sheathed toward the base. The flat and slightly stiff leaves have a width of 3 to 8 mm (0.12 to 0.31 in) are about the same length as the culms and have two distinct lateral veins. It flowers between May and August and produces three to five spikes situated at the top of the culms.

== Taxonomy ==
The species was first described by Karl Maximovich in 1886 in the Bulletin de l'Académie impériale des sciences de St.-Pétersbourg.

== Distribution ==
It is found in temperate biomes in eastern Asia including Siberia and the Primorye and Amur regions of Russia. It is also found in Manchuria, South Central and eastern parts of China as well as Japan, Mongolia and Korea.

== See also ==
- List of Carex species
