= Multangular bone =

Multangular bone may refer to:

- Trapezium, also known as the greater multangular bone
- Trapezoid bone, also known as the lesser multangular bone
