= Palmar intercarpal ligaments =

Ligament of the hand

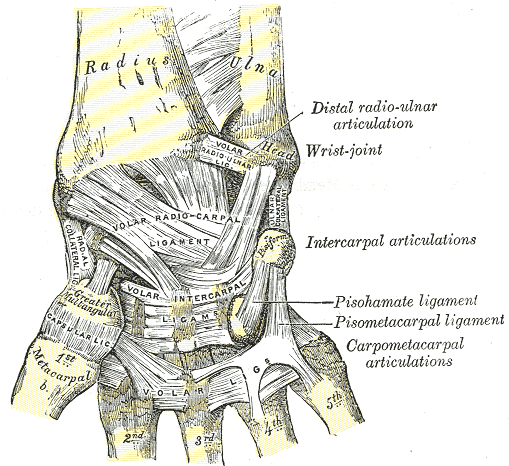
- Ligaments of wrist. Anterior view.

Details
- From: Carpal
- To: Carpal

Identifiers
- Latin: ligamenta intercarpalia palmaria
- TA98: A03.5.11.105
- TA2: 1808
- FMA: 42302

The palmar intercarpal ligaments are fibrous bands that extend transversely across the palmar surfaces of the carpal bones, connecting adjacent carpals. These are the ligaments that define the structure of the ligamentous palmar arch.

== See also ==
- Palmar carpal ligament
- Pisohamate ligament
- Pisometacarpal ligament
