= Carpometacarpal joint =

Joint between the wrist and hand

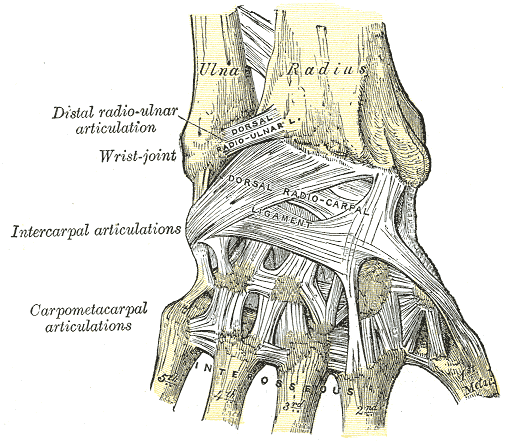
- Ligaments of wrist. Posterior view.

Details

Identifiers
- Latin: articulationes carpometacarpeae
- MeSH: D052737
- TA98: A03.5.11.301
- TA2: 1827
- FMA: 71362

The carpometacarpal (CMC) joints are five joints in the wrist that articulate the distal row of carpal bones and the proximal bases of the five metacarpal bones.

The CMC joint of the thumb or the first CMC joint, also known as the trapeziometacarpal (TMC) joint, differs significantly from the other four CMC joints and is therefore described separately.

== Thumb ==
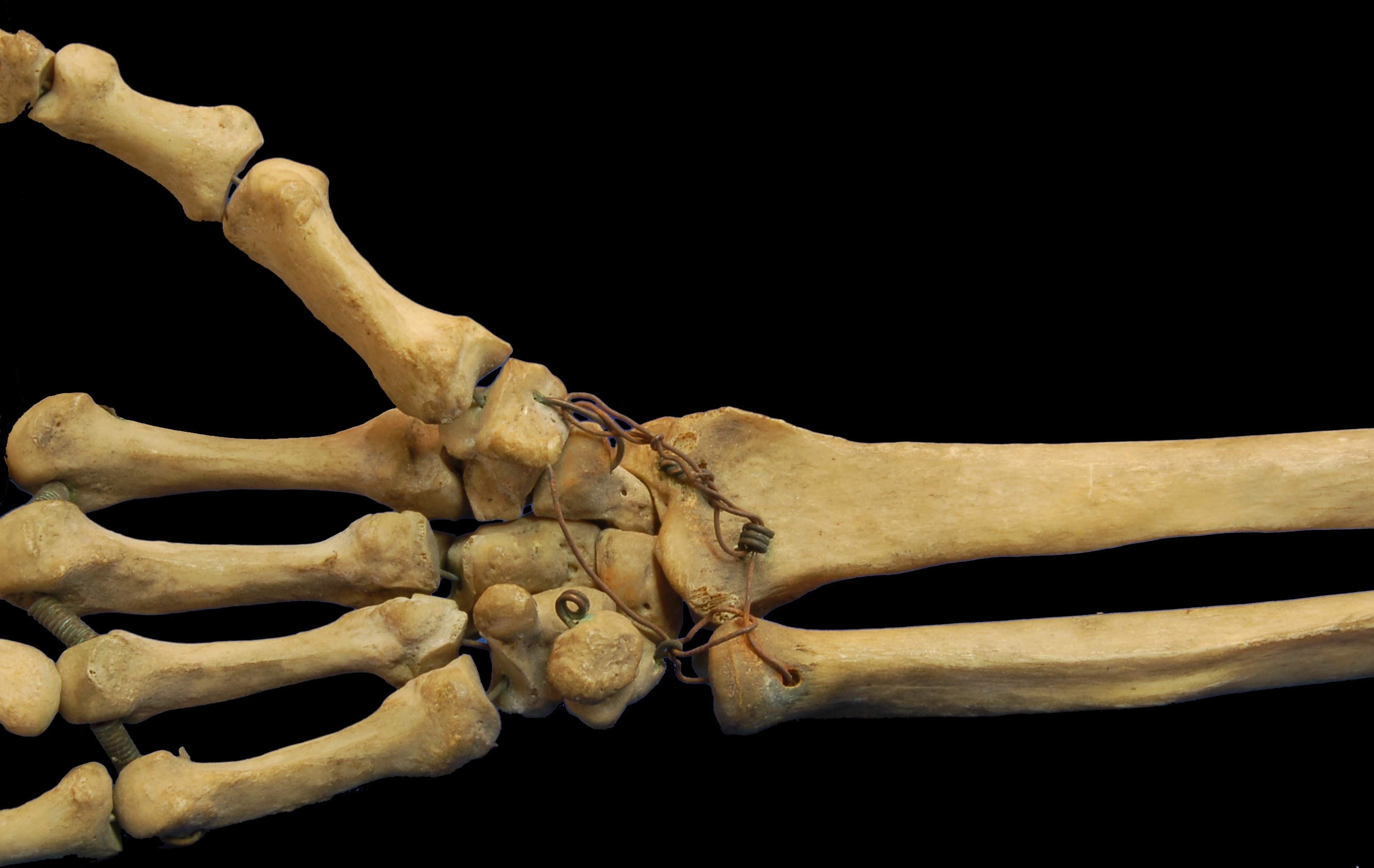
Bones of a human wrist. In this photo both the free position and the saddle shape of the first CMC joint and the proximal transverse palmar arch are clearly visible.

The carpometacarpal joint of the thumb (pollex), also known as the first carpometacarpal joint, or the trapeziometacarpal joint (TMC) because it connects the trapezium to the first metacarpal bone, plays an irreplaceable role in the normal functioning of the thumb. The most important joint connecting the wrist to the metacarpus, osteoarthritis of the TMC is a severely disabling condition; it is up to twenty times more common among elderly women than in the average.

Pronation-supination of the first metacarpal is especially important for the action of opposition. The movements of the first CMC are limited by the shape of the joint, by the capsulo-ligamentous complex surrounding the joint, and by the balance among involved muscles. If the first metacarpal fails to sit well 'on the saddle', for example because of hypoplasia, the first CMC joint tends to be subluxated (i.e. slightly displaced) towards the radius.

The capsule is sufficiently slack to allow a wide range of movements and a distraction of roughly 3 mm, while reinforcing ligaments and tendons give stability to the joint. It is slightly thicker on its dorsal side than on the other.

The first carpometacarpal joint is a frequent site of osteoarthritis in postmenopausal women.

=== Ligaments ===
The description of the number and names of the ligaments of the first CMC varies considerably in anatomical literature. Imaeda et al. 1993 describe three intracapsular and two extracapsular ligaments to be most important in stabilizing the thumb:

Anterior oblique ligament (AOL)
A strong, thick, and intracapsular ligament originating on the palmar tubercle of the trapezium to be inserted on the palmar tubercle of the first metacarpal. It is taut in abduction, extension, and pronation, and has been reported to have an important retaining function and to be elongated or absent in CMC joint arthritis.
Ulnar collateral ligament (UCL)
An extracapsular ligament, the UCL is located ulnarly to the AOL. It has its origin on the flexor retinaculum and is inserted on the ulnopalmar tubercle of the first metacarpal. It is taut in abduction, extension, and pronation, and often found elongated in connection to CMC joint arthritis. The importance ascribed to the UCL varies considerably among researchers.
First intermetacarpal ligament (IML)
Connecting the bases of the second and first metacarpals, this ligament inserts onto the ulnopalmar tubercle of the first metacarpal where its fibers intermingle with those of the UCL. It is taut in abduction, opposition, and supination. It has been reported to be the most important restraining structure of the first CMC joint by several researchers. Some consider it too weak to be able to stabilize the joint by itself, yet accept that together with the UCL it represents an important restraining structure.
Posterior oblique ligament (POL)
An intracapsular ligament stretching from the dorsoulnar side of the trapezium to the ulno-palmar tubercle of the first metacarpal. Not considered an important ligament to the first CMC joint, it tightens during forced adduction and radial abduction.
Dorsoradial ligament (DRL)
Like the previous ligament, the DRL is not considered important to the first CMC. It connects the dorsal sides of the trapezium and the first metacarpal.

Early, anatomically correct drawings of the ligaments of the first carpometacarpal joints were produced by Weitbrecht 1742.

=== Movements ===
In this articulation the movements permitted are flexion and extension in the plane of the palm of the hand, abduction and adduction in a plane at right angles to the palm, circumduction, and opposition.

- It is by the movement of opposition that the tip of the thumb is brought into contact with the volar surfaces of the slightly flexed fingers. This movement is effected through the medium of a small sloping facet on the anterior lip of the saddle-shaped articular surface of the greater multangular (trapezium). The flexor muscles pull the corresponding part of the articular surface of the metacarpal bone on to this facet, and the movement of opposition is then carried out by the adductors.
- Flexion of this joint is produced by the flexor pollicis longus and brevis, assisted by the opponens pollicis and the adductor pollicis.
- Extension is effected mainly by the abductor pollicis longus, assisted by the extensores pollicis longus and brevis.
- Adduction is carried out by the adductor; abduction mainly by the abductor pollicis longus and brevis, assisted by the extensors.

Range of motion for the first CMC is 53° of flexion/extension, 42° of abduction/adduction, and 17° of rotation.

Planes and axes of movements

The thumb's MP and CMC joints abduct and adduct in a plane perpendicular to the palm, a movement also referred to as "palmar abduction." The same joints flex and extend in a plane parallel to the palm, also referred to as "radial abduction," because the thumb moves toward the hand's radial side. Abduction and adduction occur around an antero-posterior axis, while flexion and extension occur around a lateral axis.

For ease of orientation, the thumbnail can be considered as resting in the thumb's frontal plane. Abduction and adduction of the first CMC (and MP) joint(s) occur in this plane; flexion and extension of the first CMC, MP, and IP joints occur in a plane that is perpendicular to the thumbnail. This remains true regardless of how the first metacarpal bone is being rotated during opposition and reposition.

=== Sexual dimorphism ===
Male and female thumb CMC joints are different in some aspects. In women, the trapezial articular surface is significantly smaller than the metacarpal surface, and its shape also differs from that of males. While most thumb CMC joints are more congruent in the radioulnar direction than the dorsovolar, female CMC joints are less globally congruent than male joints.

=== Evolution ===
A primitive autonomisation of the first ray took place in dinosaurs, while a real differentiation appeared in primitive primates approximately 70 million years ago. The shape of the human TMC joint dates back about 5 million years ago. As a result of evolution, the human thumb CMC joint has positioned itself at 80° of pronation, 40° of abduction, and 50° of flexion in relation to an axis passing through the stable second and third CMC joints.

== Fingers ==
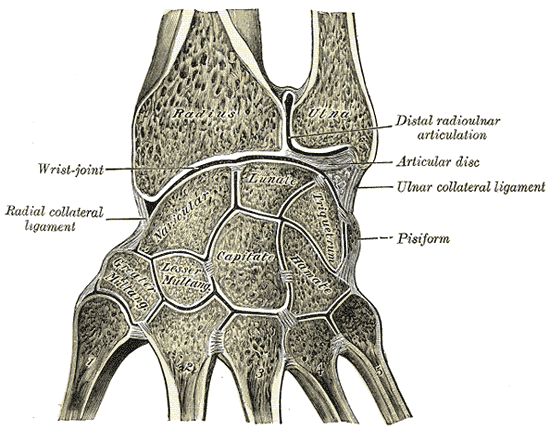
Section through the human wrist

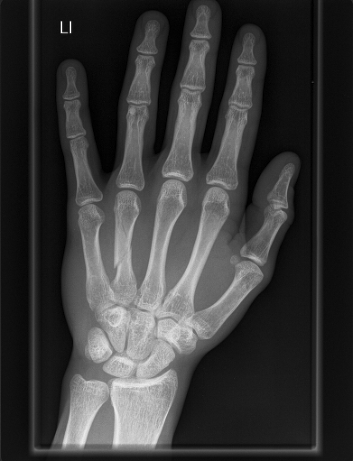
X-ray of a human hand

- The second metacarpal articulates primarily with the trapezoid and secondarily with the trapezium and capitate.
- The third metacarpal articulates primarily with the capitate,
- The fourth metacarpal articulates with the capitate and hamate.
- The fifth metacarpal articulates with the hamate.

Among themselves, the four ulnar metacarpals also articulates with their neighbours at the intermetacarpal joints.

=== Ligaments ===
These four CMC joints are supported by strong transverse and weaker longitudinal ligaments: the dorsal carpometacarpal ligaments and the volar or palmar carpometacarpal ligaments.

The interosseous ligaments consist of short, thick fibers, and are limited to one part of the carpometacarpal articulation; they connect the contiguous inferior angles of the capitate and hamate with the adjacent surfaces of the third and fourth metacarpal bones.

=== Movements ===
The carpometacarpal joints of second through fifth digits are arthrodial. The movements permitted in the second through fifth carpometacarpal joints most readily observable in the (distal) heads of the metacarpal bones. The range of motions in these joints decrease from the fifth to the second CMCs.

The second to fifth joints are synovial condyloid joints with a nominal degree of freedom (flexion/extension). The second and third joints are however almost essentially immobile and can be considered to have zero degrees of freedom in practice, but capable of anteroposterior gliding (translation) movements. The second and third CMC however also capable of small degree of flexion-extension motion (11 degrees of flexion-extension motion for the second, while 7 degrees for the third). These two CMC provide the other three CMCs with a fixed and stable axis. While the mobility of the fourth CMC joint thus is perceptible, the first joint is a saddle joint with two degrees of freedom which except flexion/extension also enable abduction/adduction and a limited amount of opposition. Together the movements of the fourth and fifth CMCs facilitates for their fingers to oppose the thumb.

=== Function ===
The function of the finger carpometacarpal joints and their segments overall is to contribute to the palmar arch system together with the thumb. The proximal transverse arch of the palm is formed by the distal row of carpal bones. The concavity of this arch is augmented at the level of the metacarpal heads by the flexibility of the first, fourth, and fifth metacarpal heads around the fixed second and third metacarpal heads; a flexible structure called the distal transverse arch. For each finger there is also a longitudinal arch. Together, these arches allow the palm and the digits to conform optimally to objects as we grasp them (so-called palmar cupping). Furthermore, as the amount of surface contact is maximized, stability is enhanced and sensory feedback increases. The deep transverse metacarpal ligament stabilises the mobile parts of the palmar arch system.

As the fingers are being flexed, palmar cupping is contributed to by muscles crossing the carpometacarpal joints when they act on the mobile parts of the palmar arch system. The oblique opponens digiti minimi muscle of hand acts on the fifth carpometacarpal joint and is the only muscle that act on the carpometacarpal joints alone. It is optimally positioned to flex and rotate the fifth metacarpal bone about its long axis. Palmar arching is further increased when [flexor carpi ulnaris] (which is attached to the pisiform) and intrinsic hand muscles attached to the transverse carpal ligament acts on the arch system. The fixed second and third carpometacarpal joints are crossed by the radial wrist muscles (flexor carpi radialis, extensor carpi radialis longus, and extensor carpi radialis brevis). The stability of these two carpometacarpal joints is a functional adaptation that enhances the efficiency of these muscles at the midcarpal and wrist.

== Synovial membranes ==
The synovial membrane is a continuation of that of the intercarpal joints. Occasionally, the joint between the hamate and the fourth and fifth metacarpal bones has a separate synovial membrane.

The synovial membranes of the wrist and carpus are thus seen to be five in number:

- The first passes from the lower end of the ulnar to the ulnar notch of the radius, and lines the upper surface of the articular disk.
- The second passes from the articular disk and the lower end of the radius above, to the bones of the first row below.
- The third, the most extensive, passes between the contiguous margins of the two rows of carpal bones, and sometimes, in the event of one of the interosseous ligaments being absent, between the bones of the second row to the carpal extremities of the second, third, fourth, and fifth metacarpal bones.
- The fourth extends from the margin of the greater multangular to the metacarpal bone of the thumb.
- The fifth runs between the adjacent margins of the triangular and pisiform bones.

Occasionally the fourth and fifth carpometacarpal joints have a separate synovial membrane.

== Clinical significance ==
Osteoarthritis of the carpometacarpal joints is a type of joint disease that results from breakdown of joint cartilage and underlying bone. When it affects the thumb it is termed trapeziometacarpal osteoarthritis.

Carpometacarpal bossing is the presence of a small immovable protuberance over the joint.

== Bibliography ==
- Ateshian, G A; Rosenwasser, M P; Mow, V C (June 1992). "Curvature characteristics and congruence of the thumb carpometacarpal joint: differences between female and male joints". J Biomech. 25 (6)): 591–607. doi:10.1016/0021-9290(92)90102-7. PMID 1517255. Archived from the original on 2010-08-28.
- Austin, Noelle M. (2005). "Chapter 9: The Wrist and Hand Complex". In Levangie, Pamela K.; Norkin, Cynthia C. (eds.). Joint Structure and Function: A Comprehensive Analysis (4th ed.). Philadelphia: F. A. Davis Company. ISBN 978-0-8036-1191-7.
- Brunelli, Giovanni R. (1999). "Stability of the first carpometacarpal joint". In Brüser, Peter; Gilbert, Alain (eds.). Finger bone and joint injuries. Taylor & Francis. pp. 167–170. ISBN 978-1-85317-690-6.
- Imaeda, T; An, K N; Cooney, W P; Linscheid, R (1993). "Anatomy of trapeziometacarpal ligaments". The Journal of Hand Surgery (American Volume). 18 (2): 226–31. doi:10.1016/0363-5023(93)90352-4. PMID 8463585.
- Lewis, O J (February 1977). "Joint remodelling and the evolution of the human hand". J. Anat. 123 (Pt 1): 157–201. PMC 1234261. PMID 402345.
- Thompson, Dave (February 2001). "CMC Joint of the Thumb". University of Oklahoma Health Sciences Center. Archived from the original on 2009-11-18.
- Weitbrecht, Josias (1742). "Syndesmologia sive, Historia ligamentorvm corporis hvmani qvam secvndvm observationes anatomicas concinnavit et figvris ad obiecta recentia advmbratis illvstravit Iosias Weitbrecht". University of Otago, NZ. Archived from the original on 2010-05-23.
