= Radiate carpal ligament =

Ligament of the hand

Details
- From: Capitate
- To: Triquetral, lunate, scaphoid

Identifiers
- Latin: ligamentum carpi radiatum
- TA98: A03.5.11.103
- TA2: 1805
- FMA: 42298

The radiate carpal ligament is a group of about seven fibrous bands which diverge in all directions on the palmar surface of the carpal bones. The majority of the bands radiate from the capitate to the scaphoid, lunate, and triquetral bones.
