= Palmar carpometacarpal ligaments =

Ligaments of the wrist

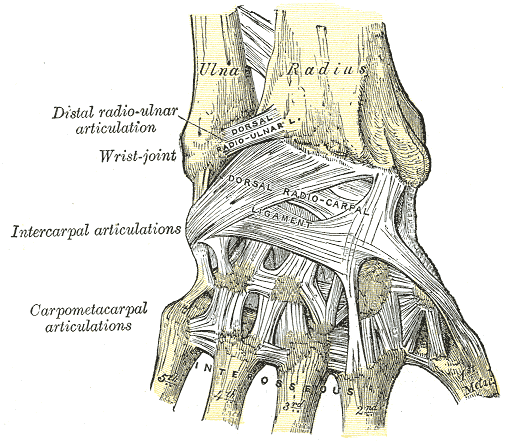
- Ligaments of wrist. Posterior view.

Details
- From: Carpus
- To: Metacarpus

Identifiers
- Latin: ligamenta carpometacarpalia palmaria
- TA98: A03.5.11.303
- TA2: 1829
- FMA: 71403

The palmar carpometacarpal ligaments (or volar) are a series of bands on the palmar surface of the carpometacarpal joints that connect the carpal bones to the second through fifth metacarpal bones. The second metacarpal is connected to the trapezium. The third metacarpal is connected to the trapezium, to the capitate, and to the hamate. The fourth and fifth metacarpals are connected to the hamate.

The palmar carpometacarpal ligaments have a somewhat similar arrangement to the dorsal carpometacarpal ligaments, with the exception of those of the third metacarpal, which are three in number:

- a lateral one from the greater multangular, situated superficial to the sheath of the tendon of the flexor carpi radialis;
- and intermediate one from the capitate;
- and a medial one from the hamate.
