= Carpal tunnel =

Structure of human wrist

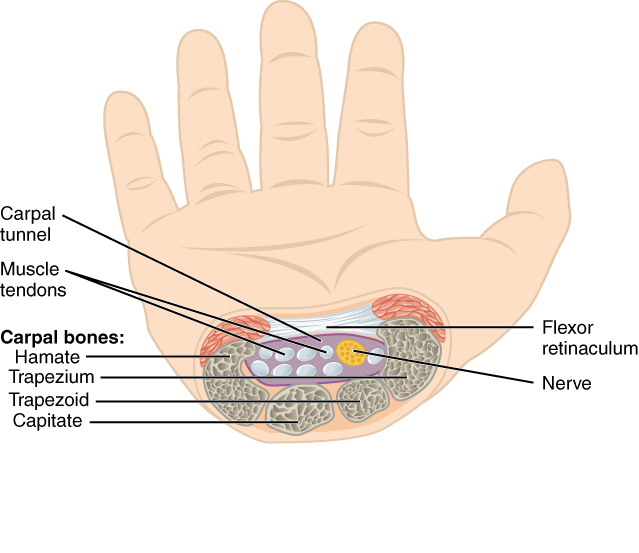
- The carpal tunnel

Details

Identifiers
- Latin: canalis carpi
- TA98: A03.5.11.201
- TA2: 2551
- FMA: 42352

In the human body, the carpal tunnel or carpal canal is a flattened body cavity on the flexor (palmar/volar) side of the wrist, bounded by the carpal bones and flexor retinaculum. It forms the passageway that transmits the median nerve and the tendons of the extrinsic flexor muscles of the hand from the forearm to the hand. The median artery is an anatomical variant (increasingly found). When present it lies between the radial artery, and the ulnar artery and runs with the median nerve supplying the same structures innervated.

When swelling or degeneration occurs in the tendons and sheaths of any of the nine flexor muscles (flexor pollicis longus, four flexor digitorum profundus and four flexor digitorum superficialis) passing through the carpal tunnel, the canal can narrow and compress/entrap the median nerve, resulting in a compression neuropathy known as carpal tunnel syndrome (CTS). If untreated, neuropraxia, parasthesia and muscle atrophy (especially of the thenar muscles) can occur. The condition often requires surgical division of the retinaculum to relieve the pressure upon the nerve.

== Structure ==
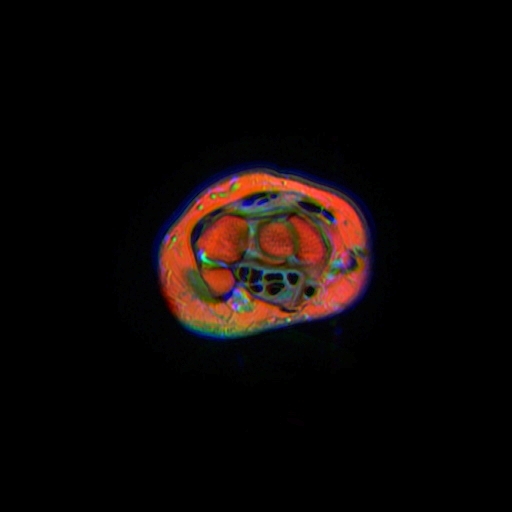
Carpal tunnel as seen on MRI

The carpal bones that make up the wrist form an arch which is convex on the dorsal side of the hand and concave on the palmar side. The groove on the palmar side, the sulcus carpi, is covered by the flexor retinaculum, a rigid band of fibrous tissue, thus forming the carpal tunnel. On the side of the radius, the flexor retinaculum is attached to the scaphoid bone, more precisely its tubercle, as well as the ridge of trapezium. On the ulnar side, it is attached to the pisiform and hook of hamate.

The narrowest section of the tunnel is located a centimetre beyond the mid-line of the distal row of carpal bones where the sectional area is limited to 1.6 cm^{2}.

The tendons of the flexor digitorum superficialis and profundus pass through a common ulnar sheath, while the tendon of the flexor pollicis longus passes through a separate radial sheath. The mesotendon shared by these tendons is attached to the radial and palmar walls of the carpal tunnel.

Superficial to the carpal tunnel and the flexor retinaculum, the ulnar artery and ulnar nerve pass through the ulnar tunnel/Guyon's canal.

== Function ==
Transverse section across the wrist and carpals; the palm is at the top (carpal tunnel not labeled but visible at centre)

Ten structures pass through the carpal tunnel, most of them flexor tendons (not the muscles themselves):

- flexor digitorum profundus (four tendons)
- flexor digitorum superficialis (four tendons)
- flexor pollicis longus (one tendon)
- Median nerve between tendons of flexor digitorum profundus and flexor digitorum superficialis

The flexor carpi radialis (one tendon) is often incorrectly stated to travel within the carpal tunnel. More precisely, it travels within the fibers of the flexor retinaculum, which forms the roof of the carpal tunnel, rather than running inside the tunnel itself.

=== Effect of wrist movements ===
Movements in the wrist affect the shape and width of the carpal tunnel. The width decreases considerably during the normal range of motion in the wrist; and because the carpal bones move in relation to each other with every motion of the hand, the bony walls of the tunnel are not rigid. Both flexion and extension increase compression in the carpal tunnel.

- Flexing the wrist causes the flexor retinaculum to move closer to the radius which considerably decreases the cross section of the proximal opening of the tunnel. Additionally, the distal end of the capitate presses into the opening.
- In extreme extension, the lunate constricts the passage as it is pressed toward the interior of the tunnel.

== Clinical significance ==
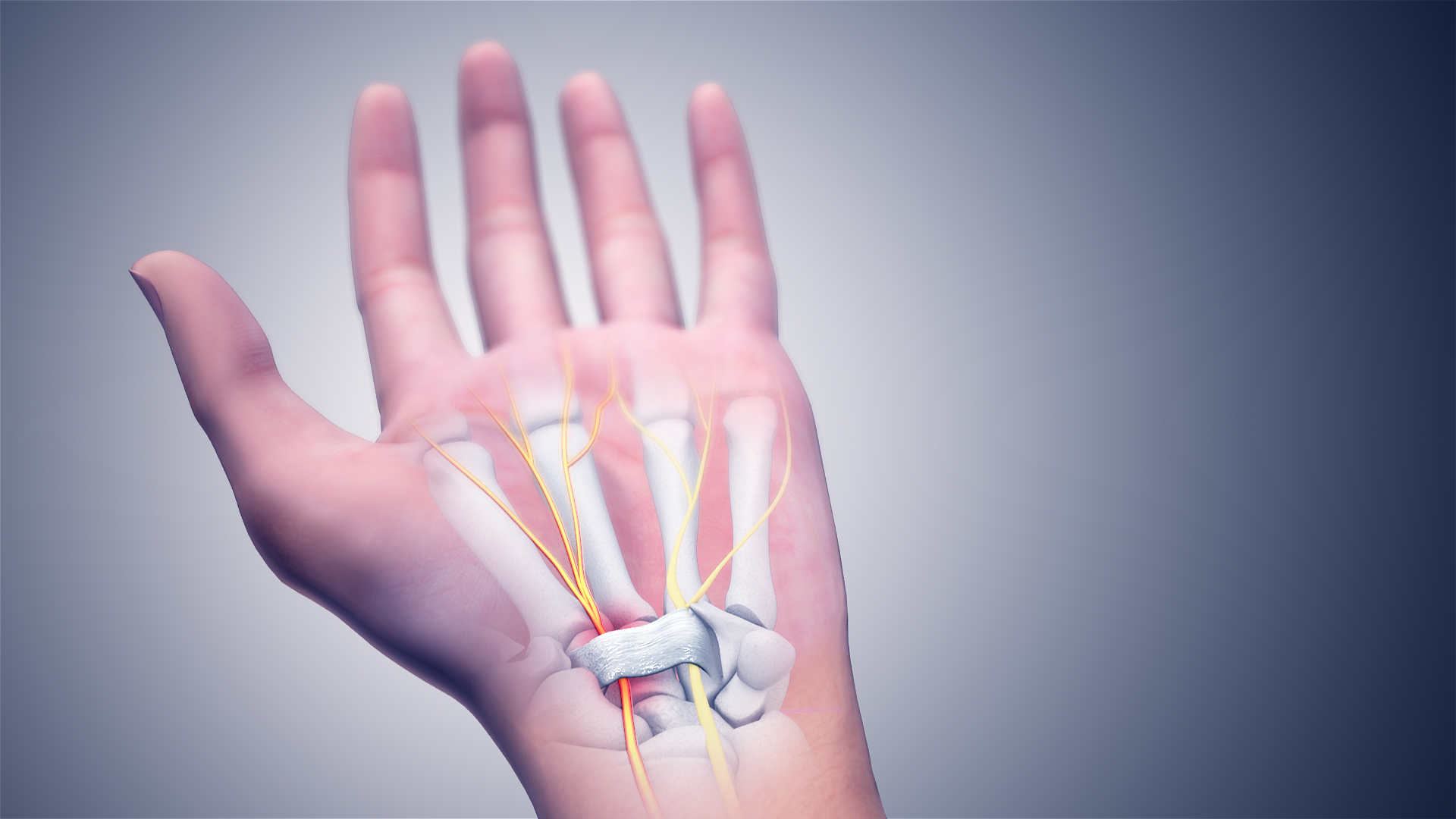
A 3D medical animation still of carpal tunnel syndrome

Carpal tunnel syndrome is characterized by tingling, burning and pain (needle, pin) through the course of median nerve particularly over the outer fingers and radiating up the arm, that is caused by compression of the carpal tunnel contents. It is associated with repetitive use, rheumatoid arthritis, and a number of other states. It can be detected using Tinel's sign and the Phalen maneuver. It may be treated non-surgically by splinting or corticosteroid injection. Definitive management often requires surgical division of the flexor retinaculum, the aponeuroses which forms the roof of the carpal tunnel, or another carpal tunnel surgery. Symptoms of the syndrome can sometimes be caused by tight muscles in the neck and shoulder region.

== Additional images ==
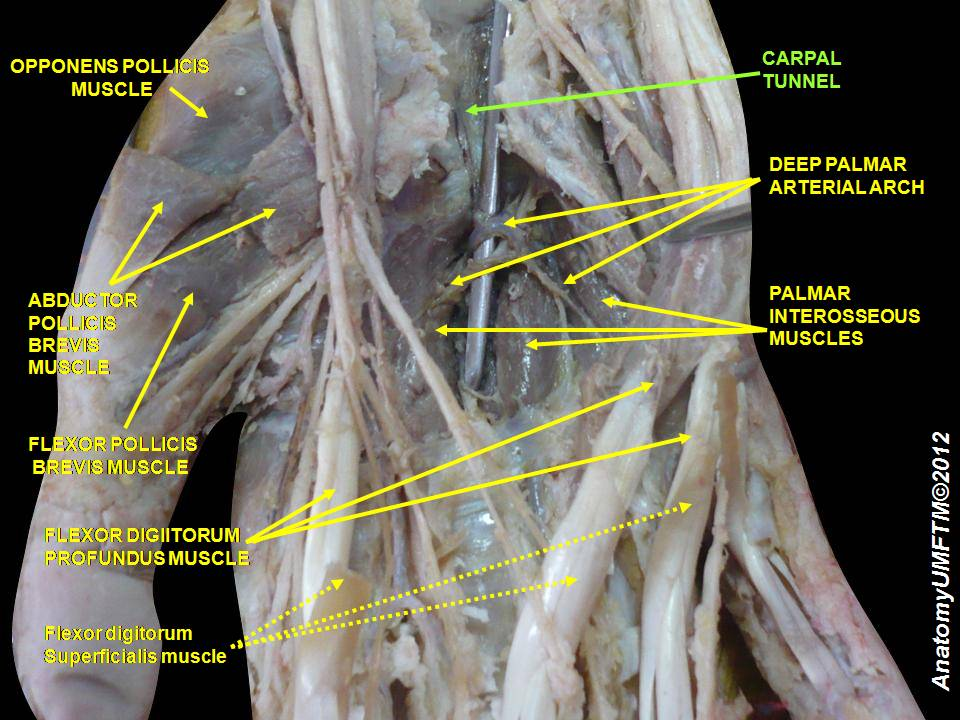
Carpal tunnel

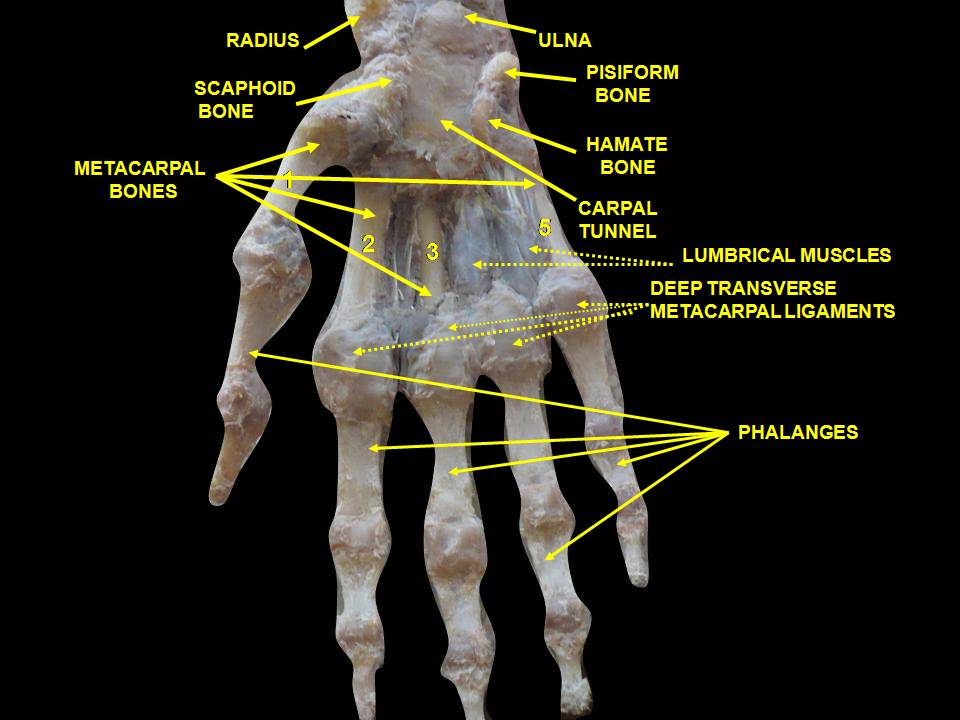
Wrist joint, deep dissection. Anterior palmar view.

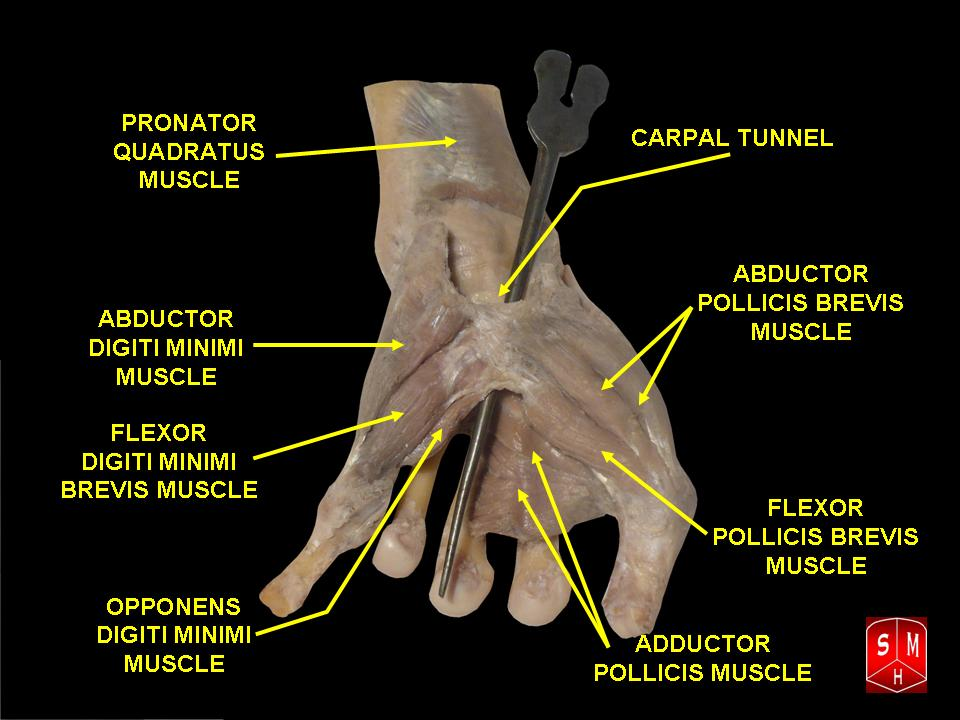
Carpal tunnel
