= Intermetacarpal joints =

Joints in the hand formed between the metacarpal bones

Details

Identifiers
- Latin: articulationes intermetacarpales
- TA98: A03.5.11.401
- TA2: 1831
- FMA: 71363

The intermetacarpal joints are in the hand formed between the metacarpal bones. The bases of the second, third, fourth and fifth metacarpal bones articulate with one another by small surfaces covered with cartilage. The metacarpal bones are connected together by dorsal, palmar, and interosseous ligaments.

- The dorsal metacarpal ligaments (ligamenta metacarpalia dorsalia) and palmar metacarpal ligaments (ligamenta metacarpalia palmaria) pass transversely from one bone to another on the dorsal and palmar surfaces.
- The interosseous metacarpal ligaments (ligamenta metacarpalia interossea) connect their contiguous surfaces, just distal to their collateral articular facets.

The synovial membrane for these joints is continuous with that of the carpometacarpal joints.

== Additional images ==
The bones in the hand

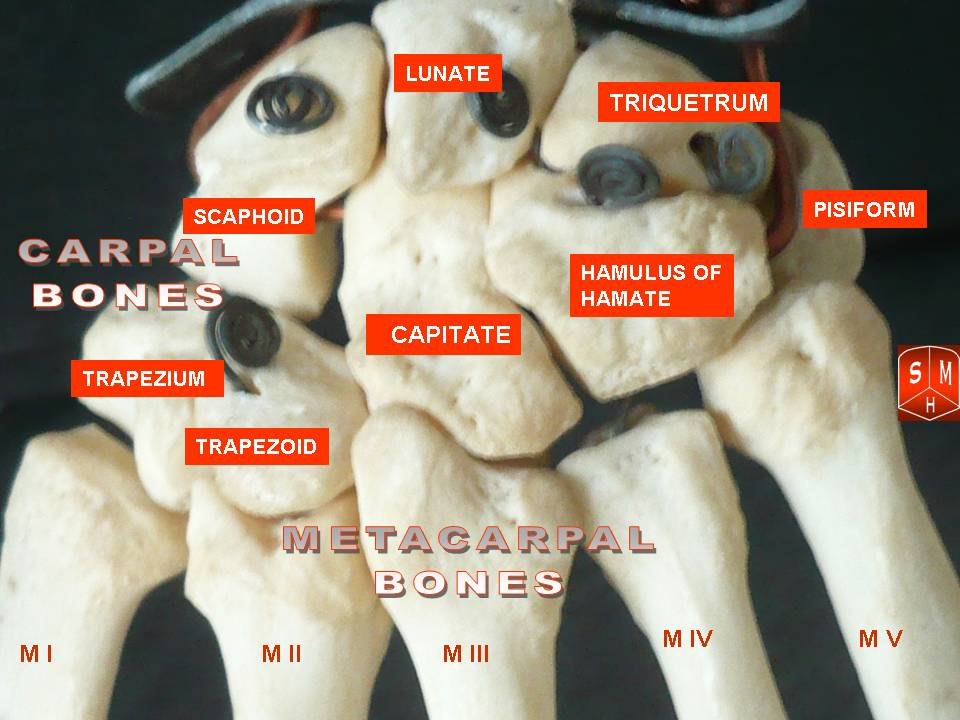
The carpal and metacarpal bones in the hand

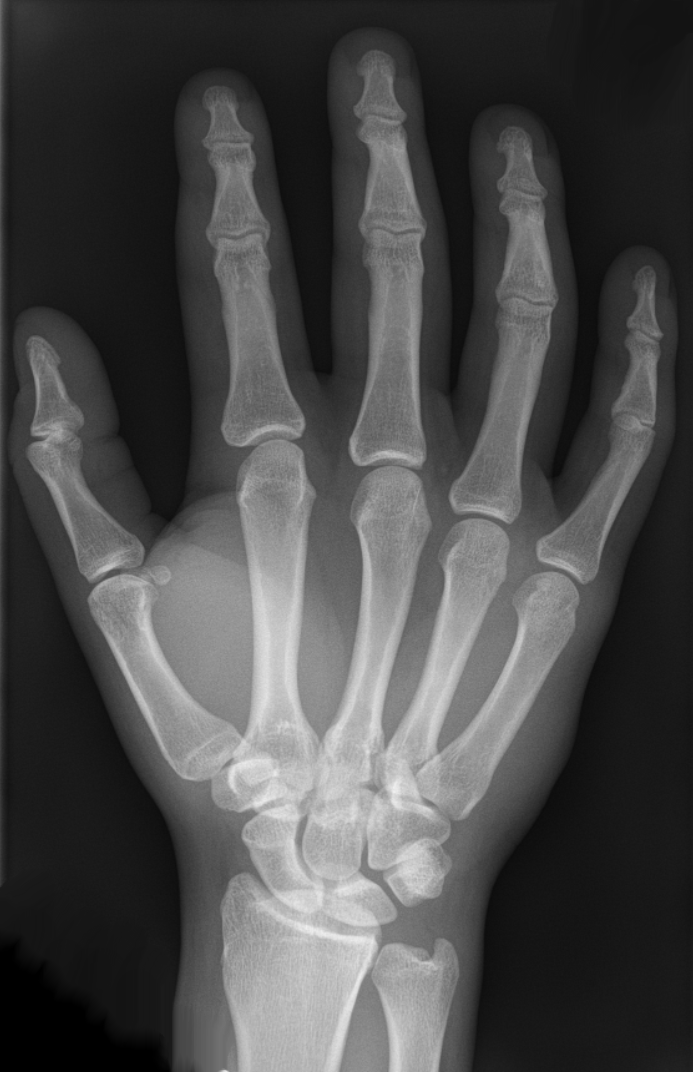
X-ray of the bones in the hand

== See also ==
- Transverse metacarpal ligament
