= Dorsal carpometacarpal ligaments =

Ligaments in the hand

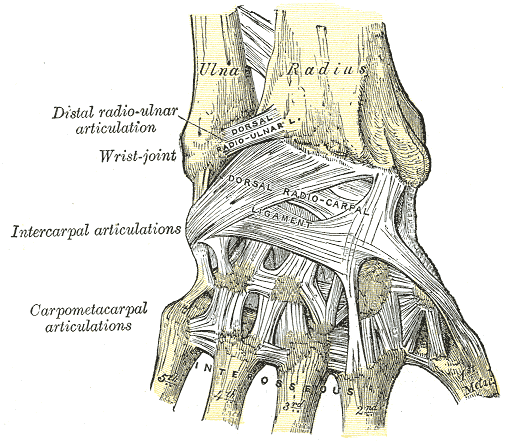
- Ligaments of wrist. Posterior view.

Details
- From: Carpus
- To: Metacarpus

Identifiers
- Latin: ligamenta carpometacarpalia dorsalia
- TA98: A03.5.11.302
- TA2: 1828
- FMA: 71402

The dorsal carpometacarpal ligaments, the strongest and most distinct carpometacarpal ligaments, connect the carpal and metacarpal bones on their dorsal surfaces.

- The second metacarpal bone receives two fasciculi, one from the greater, the other from the lesser multangular.
- The third metacarpal receives two, one each from the lesser multangular and capitate.
- The fourth two, one each from the capitate and hamate.
- The fifth receives a single fasciculus from the hamate, and this is continuous with a similar ligament on the volar surface, forming an incomplete capsule.
