= Pisiform bone =

Bone in the wrist

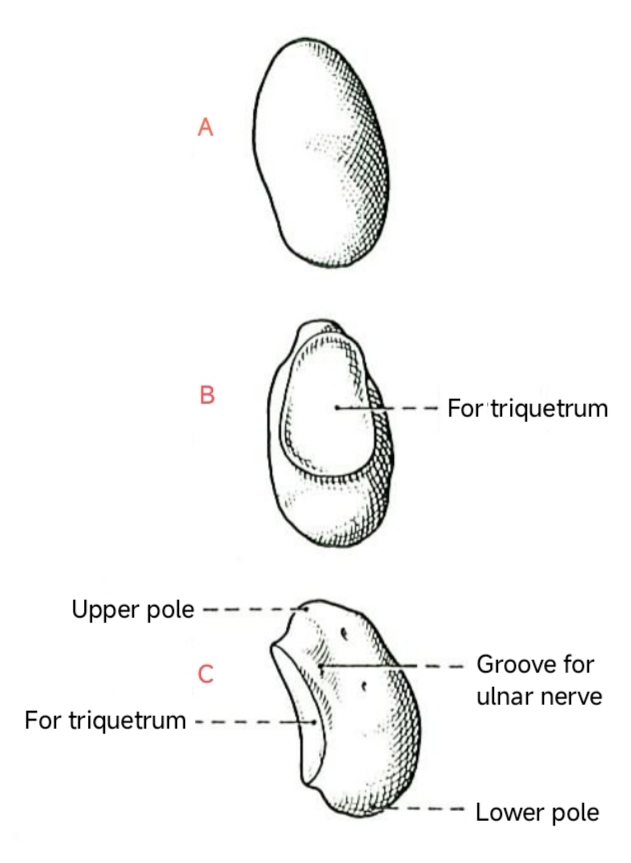
- The right pisiform. A, anterior aspect. — B, posterior aspect. — C, lateral aspect. (After Charpy.)

Details
- Origins: Ulnar collateral ligament
- Articulations: Triangular

Identifiers
- Latin: os pisiforme
- MeSH: D051220
- TA98: A02.4.08.007
- TA2: 1254
- FMA: 23718

The pisiform bone (/ˈpaɪsɪfɔːrm/ or /ˈpɪzɪfɔːrm/), also spelled pisiforme (from the Latin pisiformis, pea-shaped), is a small knobbly, sesamoid bone that is found in the wrist. It forms the ulnar border of the carpal tunnel.

== Structure ==
The pisiform is a sesamoid bone, with no covering membrane of periosteum. It is the last carpal bone to ossify. The pisiform bone is a small bone found in the proximal row of the wrist (carpus). It is situated where the ulna joins the wrist, within the tendon of the flexor carpi ulnaris muscle.

It only has one side that acts as a joint, articulating with the triquetrum. It is on a plane anterior to the other carpal bones and is spheroidal in form.

The pisiform bone has four surfaces:

1. The posterior surface is a smooth, oval facet, for articulation with the triquetrum. This facet approaches the superior, but not the inferior, border of the bone.
2. The anterior or palmar surface is rounded and rough, and gives attachment to the transverse carpal ligament, the flexor carpi ulnaris and the abductor digiti quinti.
3. The lateral surface is rough, and concave.
4. The medial surface' is rough, and convex.

== Etymology ==
The etymology derives from the Latin pisum which means "pea" ultimately derived from the Greek "pison" (pea).

== Function ==
The pisiform bone is most recognizable as an unassuming palmar projection forming the heel of human hand.

The pisiform bone, along with the hamulus of the hamate, defines the medial boundary of the carpal tunnel because the pisiform body acts as one of the four attachments points of the flexor retinaculum. It also acts as an attachment site for tendons of the abductor digiti minimi and for the flexor carpi ulnaris - the tendon in which it develops. The pisiform is the only carpal bone with insertions and attachments for the abductor digiti minimi and the flexor carpi ulnaris. It is suggested that due to the pisiform's surprisingly large range of movement along its articulation surface with the triquetral bone (about 1 cm of movement is allowed), contraction of the flexor carpi ulnaris is necessary for the pisiform to remain stable enough for the abductor digiti minimi to function effectively.

In clinical studies, the pisiform has been removed as treatment for osteoarthritis in the pisotriquetral joint. While some studies came to the conclusion that the pisiform "contributes to the stability of the ulnar column of the wrist", others suggested that while excision slightly impairs the range of motion of the wrist (especially wrist extension), the forces generated within the wrist are not significantly impacted. Subjects in the latter study did report impaired function after excision when performing heavy lifting and weightbearing activities, but this is suggested to be subjective considering that they did not have to change occupation or their level of activity as a result of the excision.

== Development ==
Compared with other non-human primates, humans have a short pisiform bone. This dramatic size difference is suggested to be the outcome of a lost growth plate in hominins some time between Australopithecus afarensis, who has been shown to have an elongated and ape-like pisiform, and Homo neanderthalensis, who is suggested to have a pisiform resembling the modern human condition.

It is suggested that the first signs of human pisiform ossification, observed between the ages of 7 and 12, corresponds to the period of secondary pisiform ossification in apes. This can point to a couple different changes in development: either this growth plate loss in humans is also accompanied by a developmental shift in the timing of pisiform formation, or it is the primary center that fails to form in humans and as a result our pisiform is homologous to the epiphysis of other mammalian pisiforms.

Studies looking at the effect of Hox gene knockouts on the formation of the pisiform in mice have suggested that the modification of Hoxa11 or Hoxd11 genes, or the downstream targets they affect, could have acted as the mechanism for the reduction we see in the human pisiform condition.

== Evolution ==
There are several hypotheses that seek to explain why we see pisiform reduction during the course of hominin evolution. Some suggest that the reduction of the pisiform allowed for ulnar deviation and that allowed for greater extension in the human wrist which increased our capacity for throwing. Scholars with this point of view would believe that these anatomical changes would improve the action of clubbing in our hominin ancestors.

Others suggest that the pisiform's link with Hoxa11 and Hoxd11 could tie its developmental history to that of the forearm, whose length is determined by Hox gene expression. Within the context of this hypothesis, because modern forearm proportions are not seen until Homo erectus at 1.5 million years ago, it is possible that pisiform reduction would have also occurred around this time. Alternatively, the same group suggests that the reduction could be a reflection of independent selection associated with the production and use of stone tools, but changes in pisiform morphology have yet to be studied in relation to their effect on wrist function.

== Other animals ==
All other tetrapods have a pisiform, being the most common sesamoid. In mammals and non-human primates, the pisiform is an enlarged and elongated bone that articulates with the distal ulna. In some taxa, the pisiform even articulates with the hammate or radius. In these non-human taxa, the pisiform develops from two ossification centers that are divided by a palmar epiphyseal plate. Because in other mammals, the bone does not follow a typical sesamoid development pattern and can be seen articulating with more than one bone, the pisiform is not a true sesamoid bone.

== See also ==
- Carpal bone
- Intercarpal articulations

== Additional images ==
Pisiform bone (red) forms ulnar border of the carpal tunnel. Left hand. Animation.

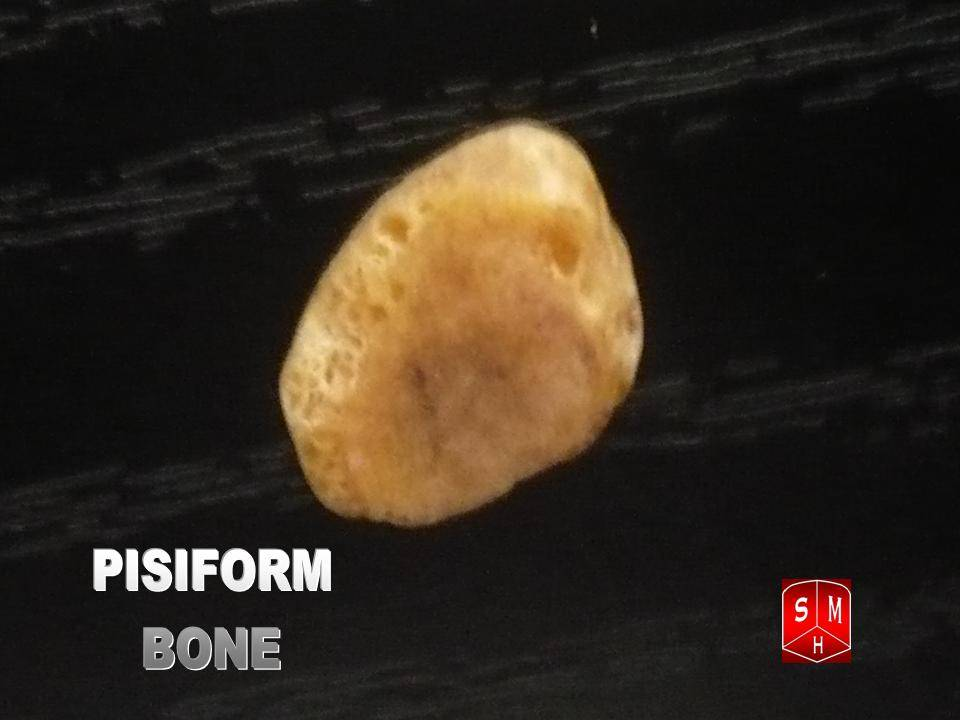
Pisiform bone.
