= Pisometacarpal ligament =

Tendon of the hand

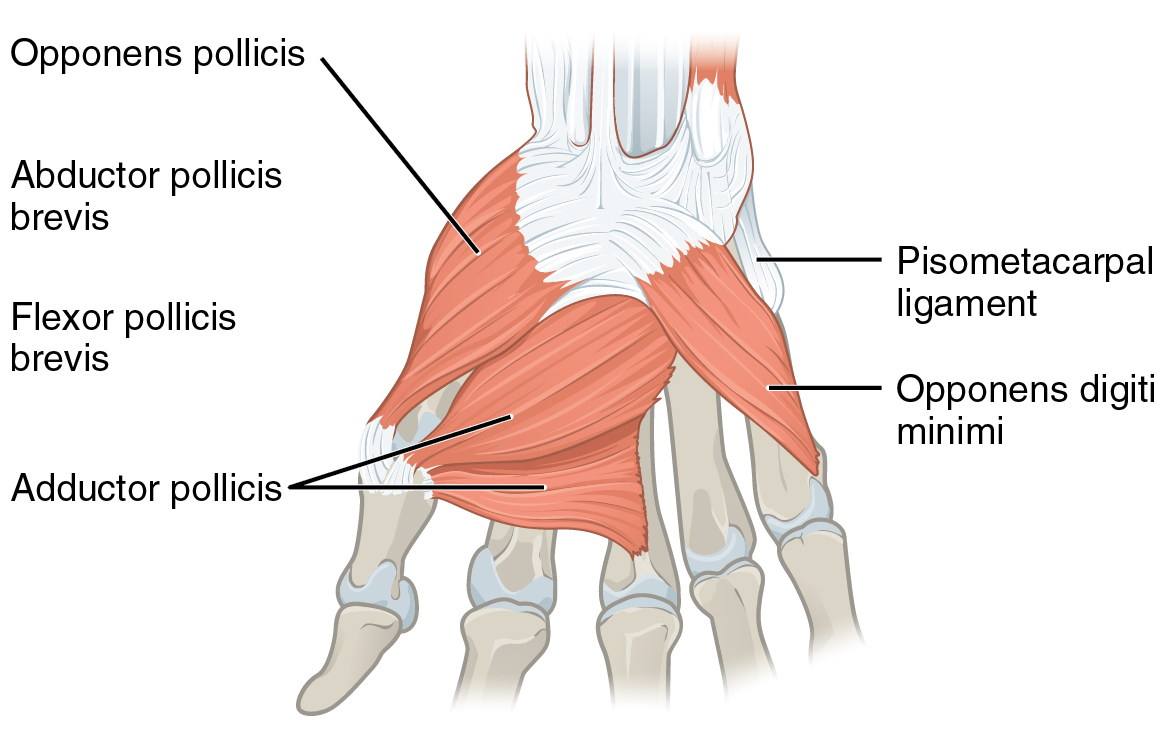
- Deep muscles of the right hand, with pisometacarpal ligament at top right. Palmar view.

Details
- From: Pisiform
- To: Fifth metacarpal

Identifiers
- Latin: ligamentum pisometacarpale, ligamentum pisometacarpeum
- TA98: A03.5.11.109
- TA2: 1826
- FMA: 42305

The pisometacarpal ligament joins the pisiform to the base of the fifth metacarpal bone. It is a continuation of the tendon of the flexor carpi ulnaris.

== Additional images ==
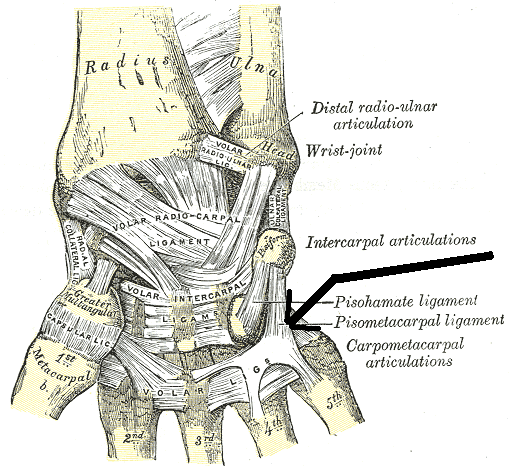
Ligaments of the right wrist. Anterior view. (Pisometacarpal labeled at right, second from bottom.)
