= Pisohamate ligament =

Tendon of the hand

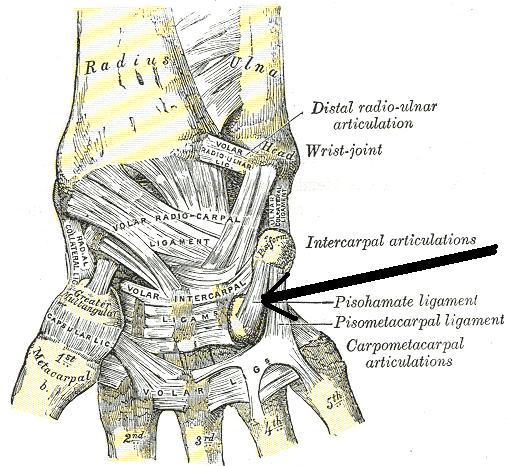
- Ligaments of wrist. Anterior view. (Pisohamate ligament labeled at center right.)

Details
- From: Pisiform
- To: Hamate

Identifiers
- Latin: ligamentum pisohamatum
- TA98: A03.5.11.108
- TA2: 1825
- FMA: 42304

The pisohamate ligament is a ligament in the hand. It connects the pisiform, a sesamoid bone in the wrist, to the hook of the hamate. It is a prolongation of the tendon of the flexor carpi ulnaris.

It serves as part of the origin for the abductor digiti minimi. It also forms the floor of the ulnar canal, a canal that allows the ulnar nerve and ulnar artery into the hand.
