= Interosseous intercarpal ligaments =

Ligaments of the hand

Details
- From: Carpal
- To: Carpal

Identifiers
- Latin: ligamenta intercarpalia interossea
- TA98: A03.5.11.106
- TA2: 1818
- FMA: 42303

The interosseous intercarpal ligaments are short fibrous bands that connect the adjacent surfaces of the various carpal bones.
