= Dorsal intercarpal ligament =

Wrist ligament

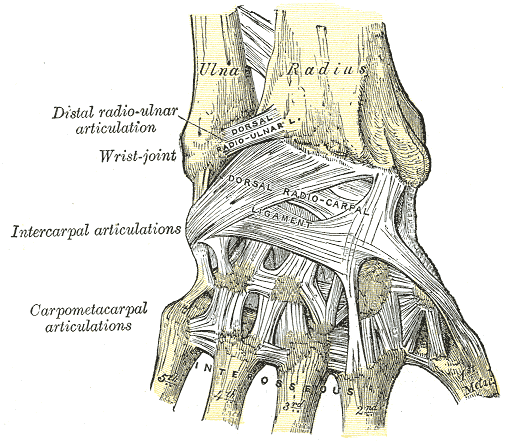
- Ligaments of wrist. Posterior view. (Dorsal intercarpal ligaments labeled at center left.)

Details
- From: Carpal
- To: Carpal

Identifiers
- Latin: ligamenta intercarpalia dorsalia
- TA98: A03.5.11.104
- TA2: 1806
- FMA: 42301

The dorsal intercarpal ligament consists of a series of fibrous bands that extend transversely across the dorsal surfaces of the carpal bones, connecting them to each other.
