= Triquetral bone =

Bone in the wrist

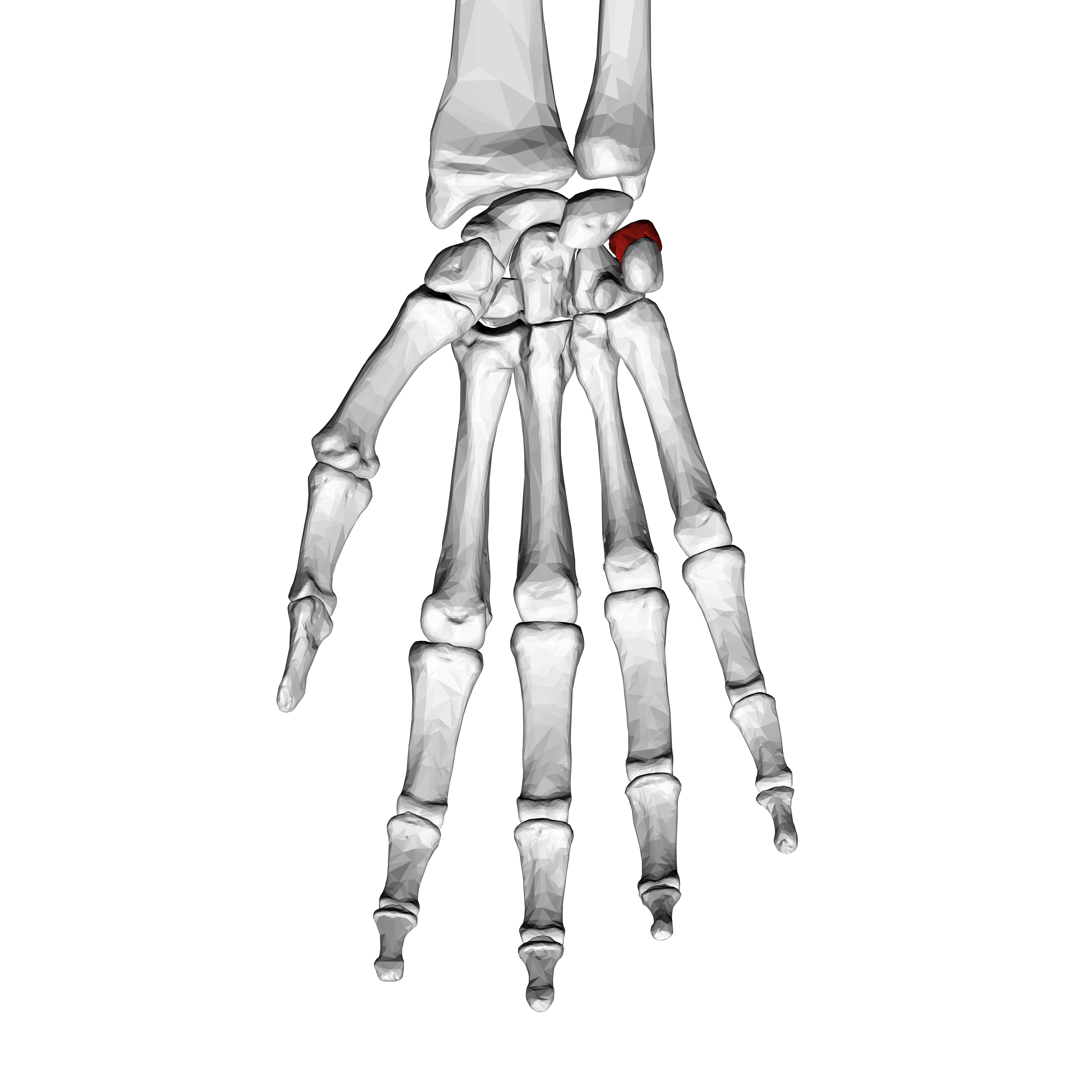
- Right hand anterior view (palmar view). Triquetrum shown in red.

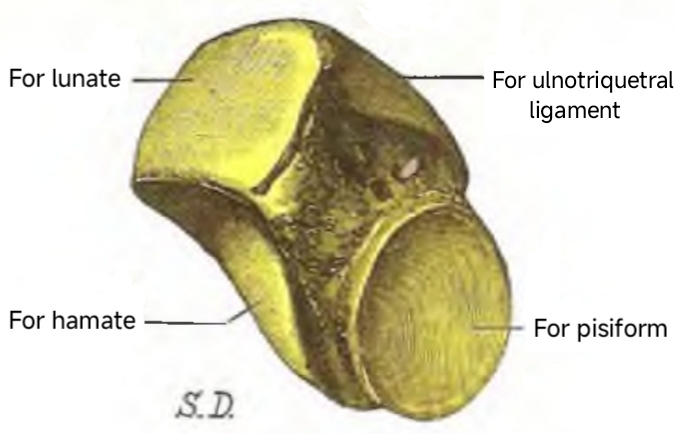
- Anterior aspect of the right triquetrum. (After Testut.)

Details
- Articulations: Articulates with three bones: lunate laterally pisiform in front hamate distally triangular articular disk which separates it from the lower end of the ulna.

Identifiers
- Latin: os triquetrum, os pyramidale
- MeSH: D051221
- TA98: A02.4.08.006
- TA2: 1253
- FMA: 23715

The triquetral bone (/traɪˈkwɛtrəl, -ˈkwiː-/; also called triquetrum, pyramidal, three-faced, and formerly cuneiform bone) is located in the wrist on the medial side of the proximal row of the carpus between the lunate and pisiform bones. It is on the ulnar side of the hand, but does not directly articulate with the ulna. Instead, it is connected to and articulates with the ulna through the Triangular fibrocartilage disc and ligament, which forms part of the ulnocarpal joint capsule. It connects with the pisiform, hamate, and lunate bones. It is the 2nd most commonly fractured carpal bone.

== Structure ==
The triquetrum is one of the eight carpal bones of the hand. It is a three-faced bone found within the proximal row of carpal bones. Situated beneath the pisiform, it is one of the carpal bones that form the carpal arch, within which lies the carpal tunnel.

The triquetral bone may be distinguished by its pyramidal shape, and by an oval isolated facet for articulation with the pisiform bone. It is situated at the upper and ulnar side of the carpus. To facilitate its palpation in an exam, the hand must be radially deviated so that the triquetrium moves out from under the ulnar styloid process. The triquetrum may be difficult to find, since it also lies under the pisiform.

The triquetral bone has nutrient foramina for entering the nutrient vessels into the bone which comes from branches of the radial, ulnar, and interosseous arteries.

== Ossification ==
According to Gray's Anatomy, the triquetral bone ossifies during the third year of life.

=== Surfaces ===
The superior surface presents a medial, rough, non-articular portion, and a lateral convex articular portion which articulates with the triangular articular disk of the wrist.

The inferior surface, directed lateralward, is concave, sinuously curved, and smooth for articulation with the hamate. The dorsal surface is rough for the attachment of ligaments.

The volar surface presents, on its medial part, an oval facet, for articulation with the pisiform; its lateral part is rough for ligamentous attachment.

The lateral surface, the base of the pyramid, is marked by a flat, quadrilateral facet, for articulation with the lunate.

The medial surface, the summit of the pyramid, is pointed and roughened, for the attachment of the ulnar collateral ligament of the wrist.

=== In animals ===
In reptiles and amphibians, the bone is instead referred to as the ulnare, since (at least in the most primitive fossils) it articulates with the ulna.

== Function ==
The carpal bones function as a unit to provide a bony superstructure for the hand.

== Fracture ==
Triquetral fractures can occur due to forceful flexion of the wrist, causing an avulsion of the dorsal aspect of the bone that is often hidden on anterior radiographs, but can be seen as a tiny bone fragment on lateral views.

== Etymology ==
The etymology derives from the Latin triquetrus which means "three-cornered." Therefore, it is sometimes also called the triangular bone or os triangulare. However, os triangulare may also refer to a nearby accessory bone.

== Additional images ==
Triquetral bone of the left hand (shown in red). Animation.

Triquetral bone of the left hand. Close up. Animation.

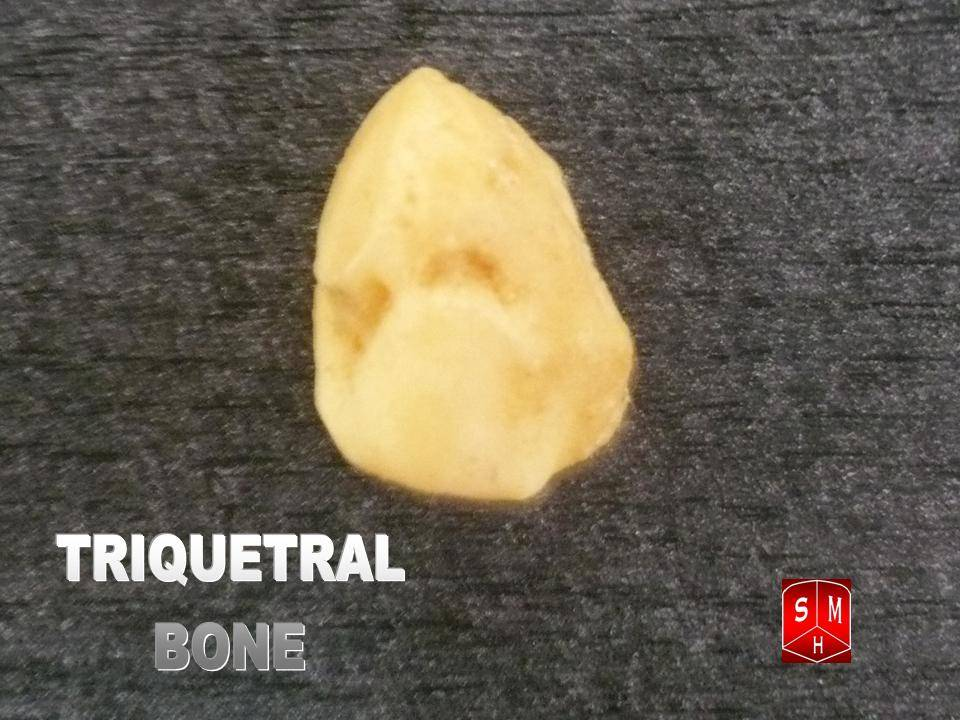
Triquetral bone.

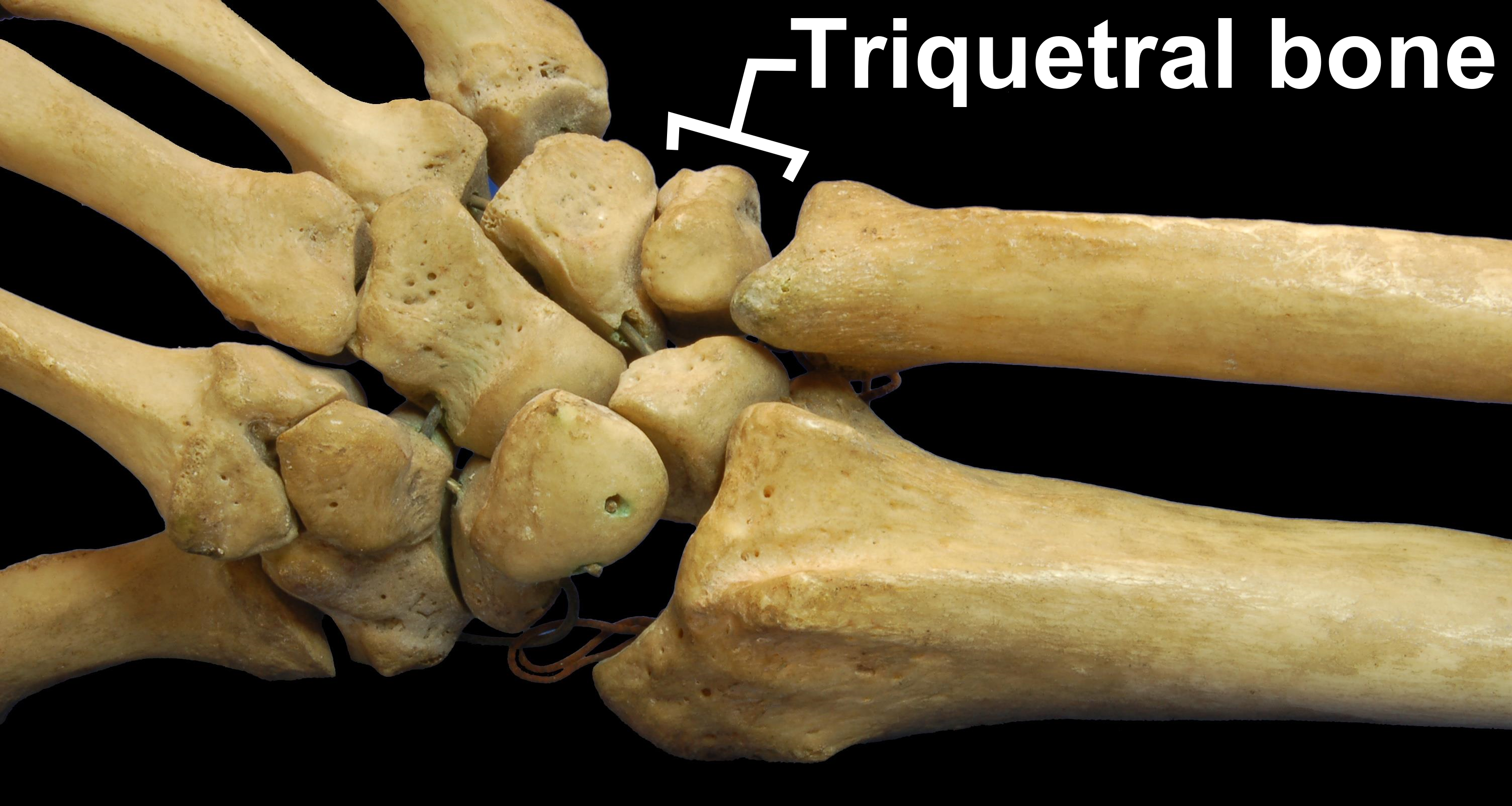
Right hand posterior view (dorsal view). Thumb on bottom.

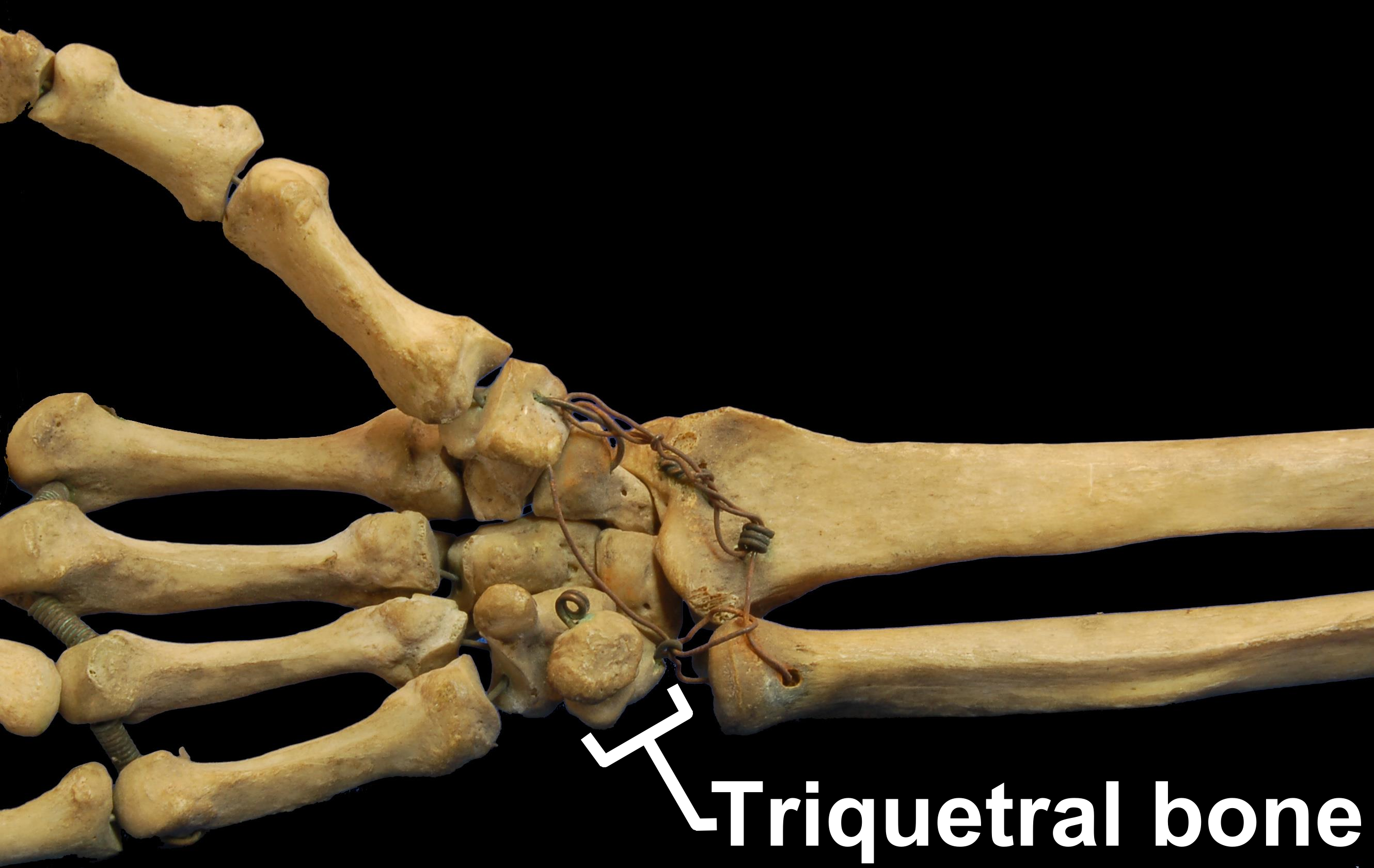
Right hand anterior view (palmar view). Thumb on top.

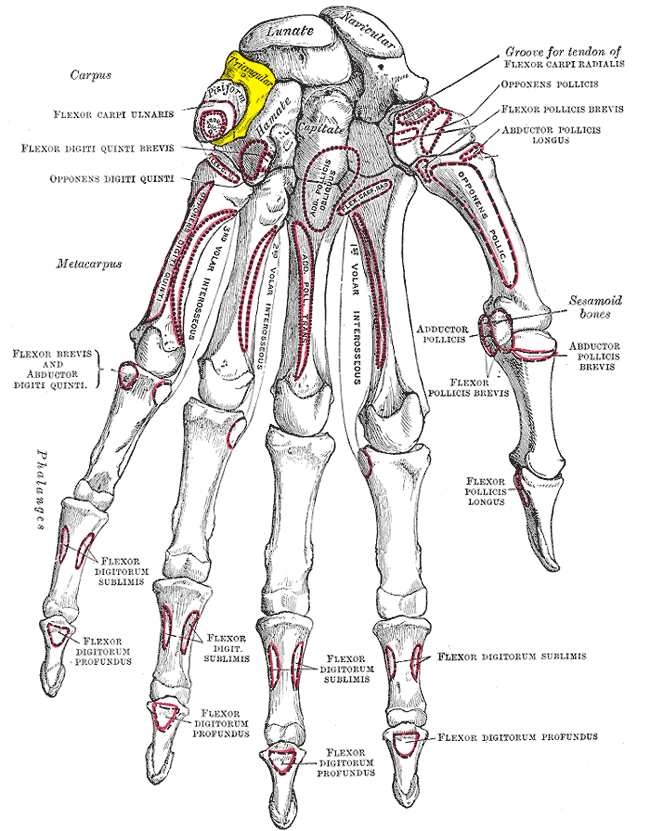
Bones of the left hand. Palmar surface. Triquetral shown in yellow.

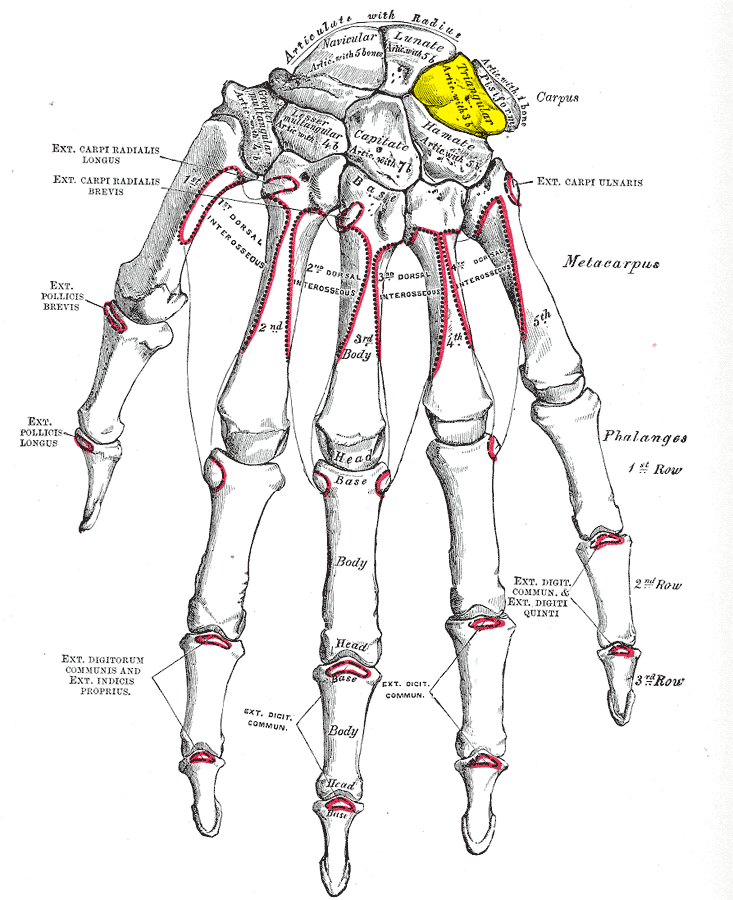
Bones of the left hand. Dorsal surface. Triquetral shown in yellow.

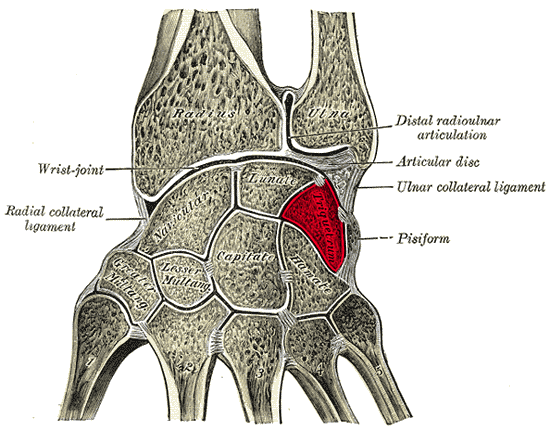
Cross section of wrist (thumb on left). Triquetral shown in red.

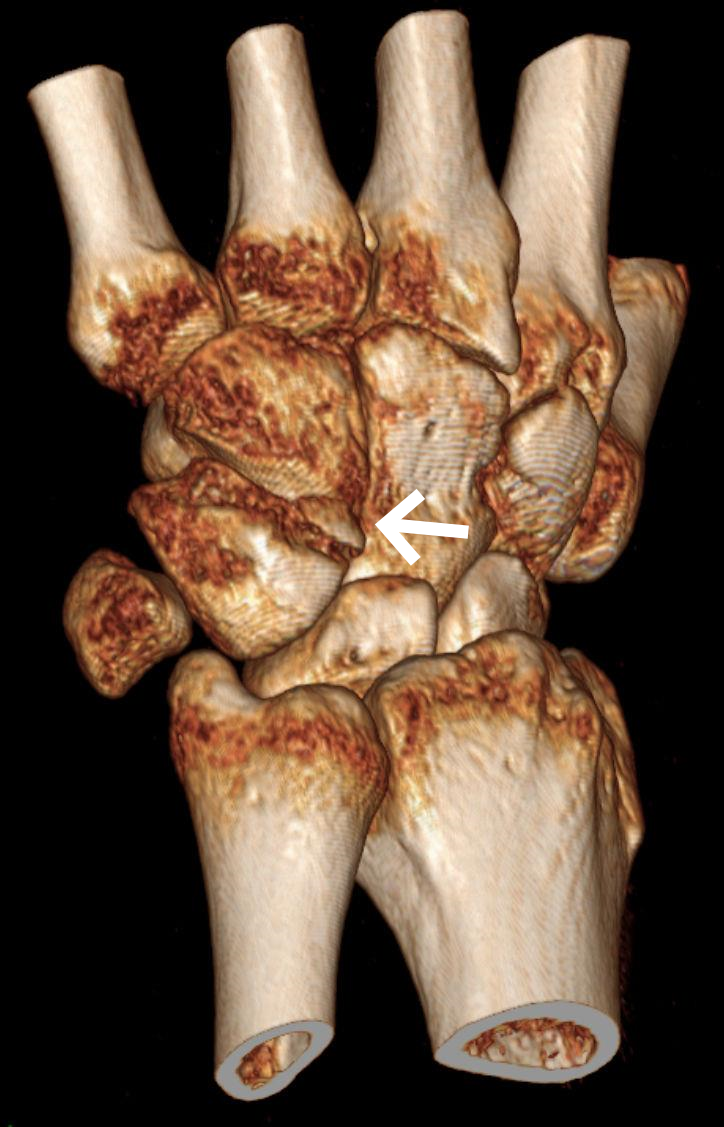
Triquetral fracture indicated by the white arrow.

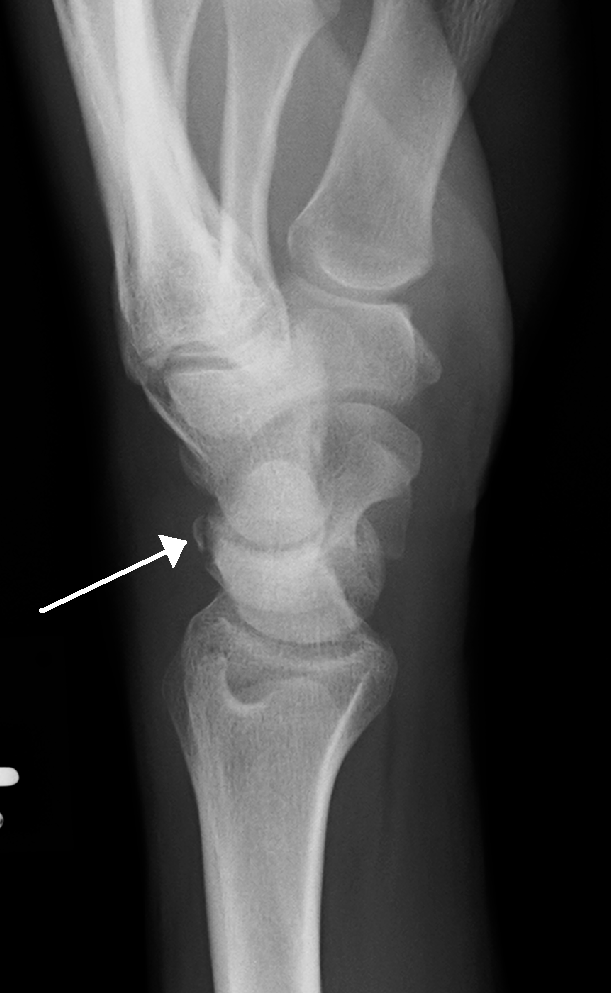
Triquetral fracture as seen on lateral view of a radiograph.

== See also ==
- Pisiform bone
