= Trapezoid bone =

Carpal (wrist) bone

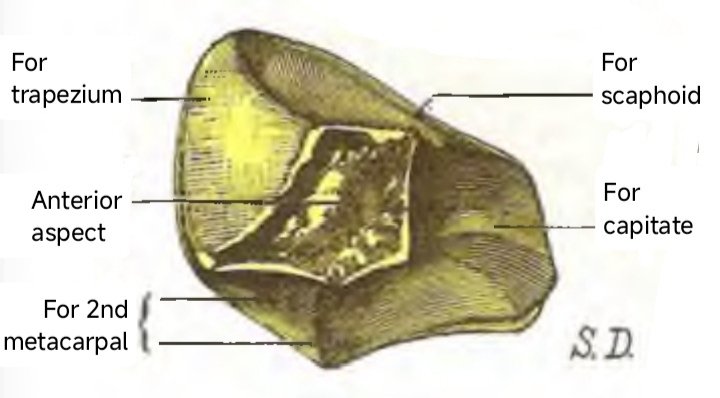
- The right trapezoid bone. Anterior view. (From Testut's Anatomy.)

Details
- Articulations: Articulates with four bones: scaphoid proximally second metacarpal distally trapezium bone laterally capitate medially

Identifiers
- Latin: os trapezoideum, os multangulum minus
- MeSH: D051223
- TA98: A02.4.08.010
- TA2: 1257
- FMA: 23724

The trapezoid bone (lesser multangular bone) is a carpal bone in tetrapods, including humans. It is the smallest bone in the distal row of carpal bones that give structure to the palm of the hand. It may be known by its wedge-shaped form, the broad end of the wedge constituting the dorsal, the narrow end the palmar surface; and by its having four articular facets touching each other, and separated by sharp edges. It is homologous with the "second distal carpal" of reptiles and amphibians.

== Structure ==
The trapezoid is a four-sided carpal bone found within the hand. The trapezoid is found within the distal row of carpal bones.

=== Surfaces ===
The superior surface, quadrilateral, smooth, and slightly concave, articulates with the scaphoid.

The inferior surface articulates with the proximal end of the second metacarpal bone; it is convex from side to side, concave from before backward and subdivided by an elevated ridge into two unequal facets.

The dorsal and palmar surfaces are rough for the attachment of ligaments, the former being the larger of the two.

The lateral surface, convex and smooth, articulates with the trapezium.

The medial surface is concave and smooth in front, for articulation with the capitate; rough behind, for the attachment of an interosseous ligament.

== Function ==
The carpal bones function as a unit to provide a bony superstructure for the hand.

== Clinical significance ==
Isolated fractures of the trapezoid are rare, representing 0.4% of the total, thus being the least common of all carpal fractures. This is due to the bone being in a fairly protected position. Distally, it forms a stable, relatively immobile joint with the second metacarpal, radially and proximally it forms strong ligaments with the trapezium and the capitate ulnarly, scaphoid respectively.

However, injury can occur through axial force applied to the second metacarpal base. Subluxations, such as ones caused by delivering a blow, are not uncommon. Direct trauma to the bone can also cause fracture.

Due to its rarity, standard treatment has not been established. A wide range of treatments are possible, including rest, surgery and casting.

== Etymology ==
The etymology derives from the Greek trapezion which means "irregular quadrilateral," from tra- "four" and peza "foot" or "edge." Literally, "a little table" from trapeza meaning "table" and -oeides "shaped."

== Additional images ==
Trapezoid bone of the left hand. Close up. Animation.

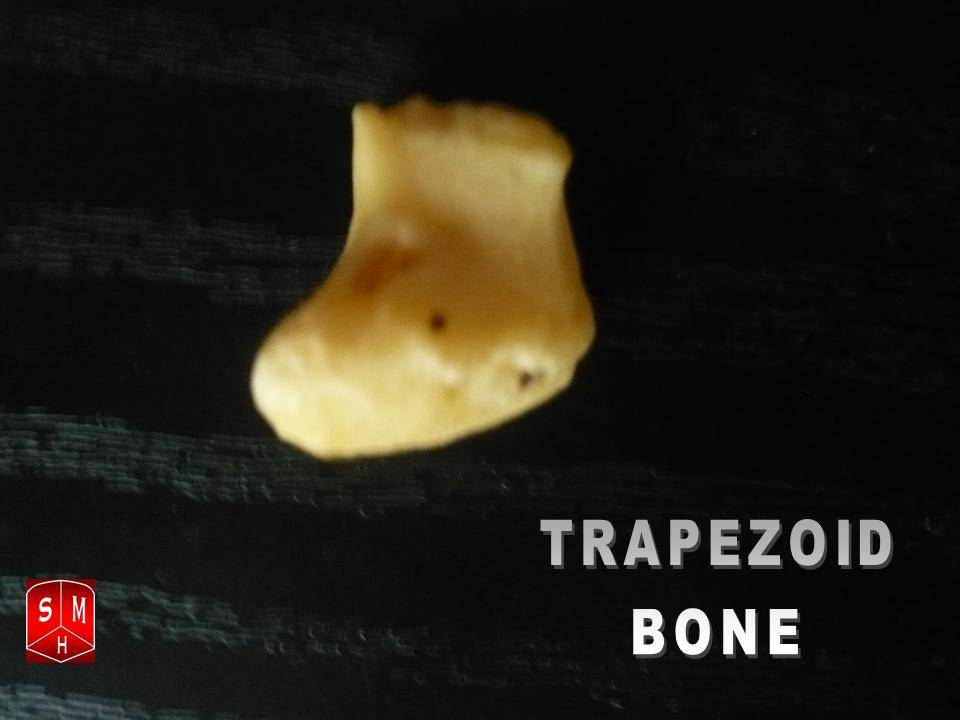
Trapezoid bone.

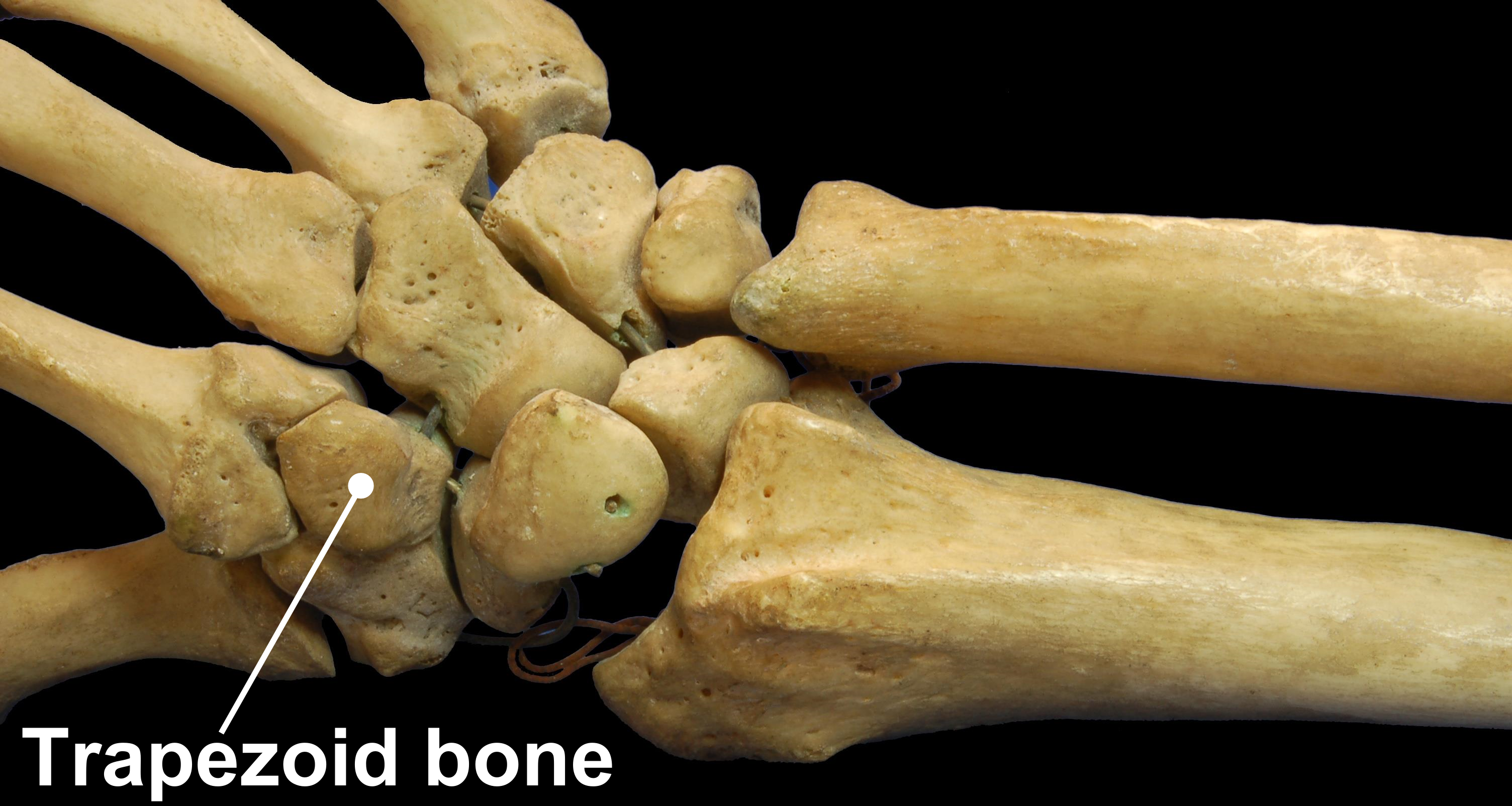
Right hand posterior view (dorsal view). Thumb on bottom.

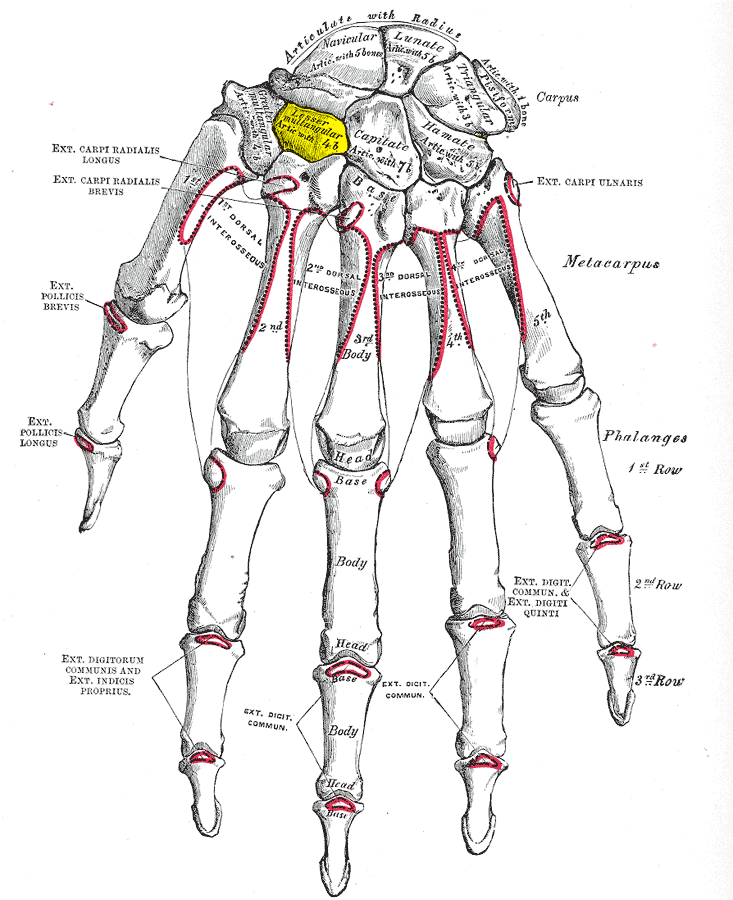
Trapezoid shown in yellow. Left hand. Dorsal surface.

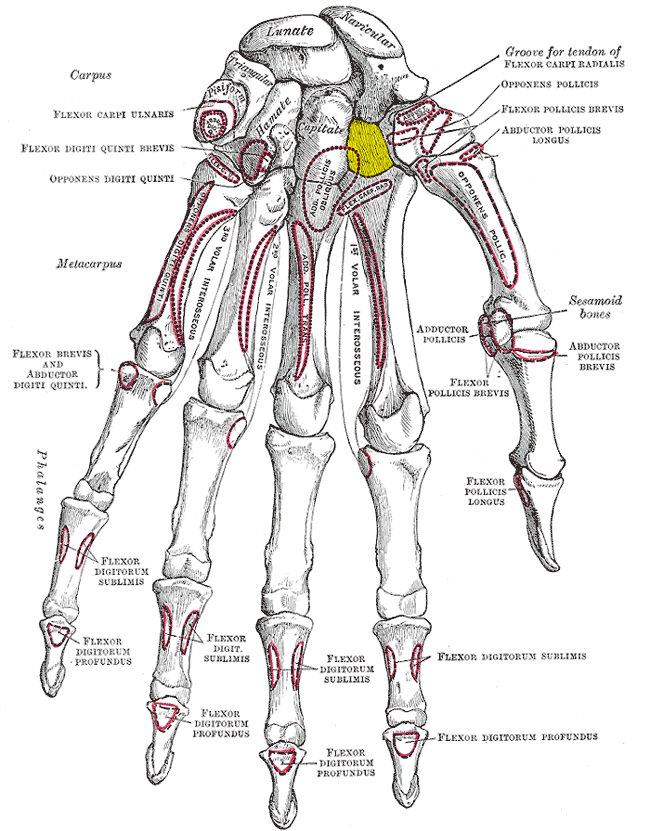
Trapezoid shown in yellow. Left hand. Palmar surface.

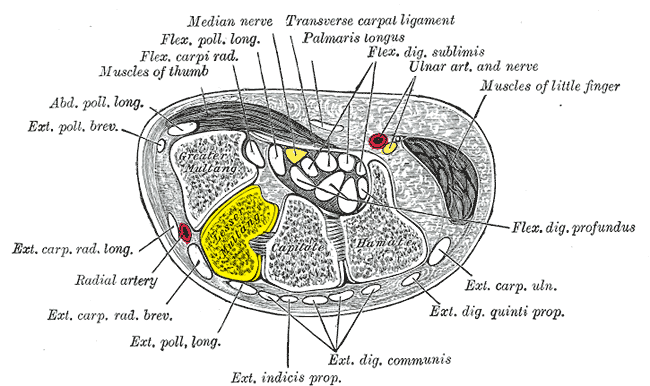
Transverse section across the wrist (palm on top, thumb on left). Trapezoid bone shown in yellow (labelled as "Lesser Multang").

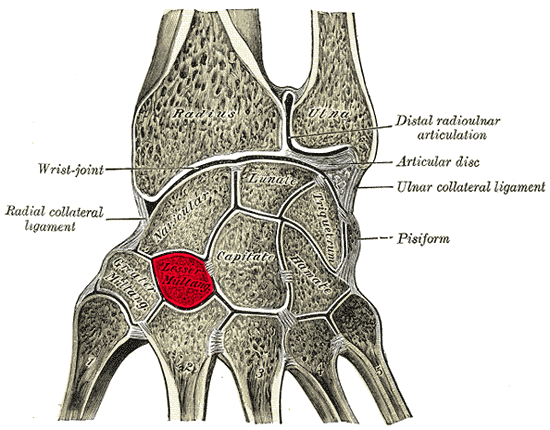
Cross section of wrist (thumb on left). Trapezoid shown in red (labelled as "Lesser Multang").

== See also ==
- Carpal bone
