= Watson's test =

Diagnostic test for instability between the scaphoid and lunate bones of the wrist

Watson's test, also known as the scaphoid shift test, is a diagnostic test for instability between the scaphoid and lunate bones of the wrist.

== Test procedure ==
To perform the test, the examiner grasps the wrist with their thumb over the scaphoid tubercle (volar aspect of the palm) in order to prevent the scaphoid from moving into its more vertically oriented position in ulnar deviation. For the test, the wrist needs to be in slight extension. The patient's wrist is then moved from ulnar to radial deviation. The examiner will feel a significant 'clunk' and the patient will experience pain if the test is positive. For completeness, the test must be performed on both wrists for comparison. If the scapholunate ligament is disrupted, the scaphoid will subluxate over the dorsal lip of the distal radius.

Original Description by Watson:

"The patient is approached by the examiner as if to engage in arm wrestling, face to face across a table with diagonally opposed hands raised (right to right or left to left) and elbows resting on the surface in between. With the patient's forearm slightly pronated, the examiner grasps the wrist from the radial side, placing his thumb on the scaphoid tuberosity (as if pushing a button to open a car door) and wrapping his fingers around the distal radius. The examiner's other hand grasps at the metacarpal level, controlling the wrist position. Starting in ulnar deviation and slight extension, the wrist is moved radially and slightly flexed with constant thumb pressure on the scaphoid. This radial deviation causes the scaphoid to flex. The examiners thumb pressure opposes this normal rotation, causing the scaphoid to shift in relation to the other bones of the carpus. This scaphoid shift may be subtle or dramatic. A truly positive test requires both pain on the back of the wrist (not just where you are pressing on the scaphoid tuberosity), and comparison with the opposite wrist is essential."

== Uses ==
Watson's test is used by physicians to diagnose scapholunate instability. This test has a low specificity and sometimes is positive for capito-lunate instability. As many as 20% of normal wrists will also have a 'clunk'.

== See also ==
- Carpus (commonly known as the wrist bones)
- Orthopedic surgery
- Wrist osteoarthritis
