= Wrist pain =

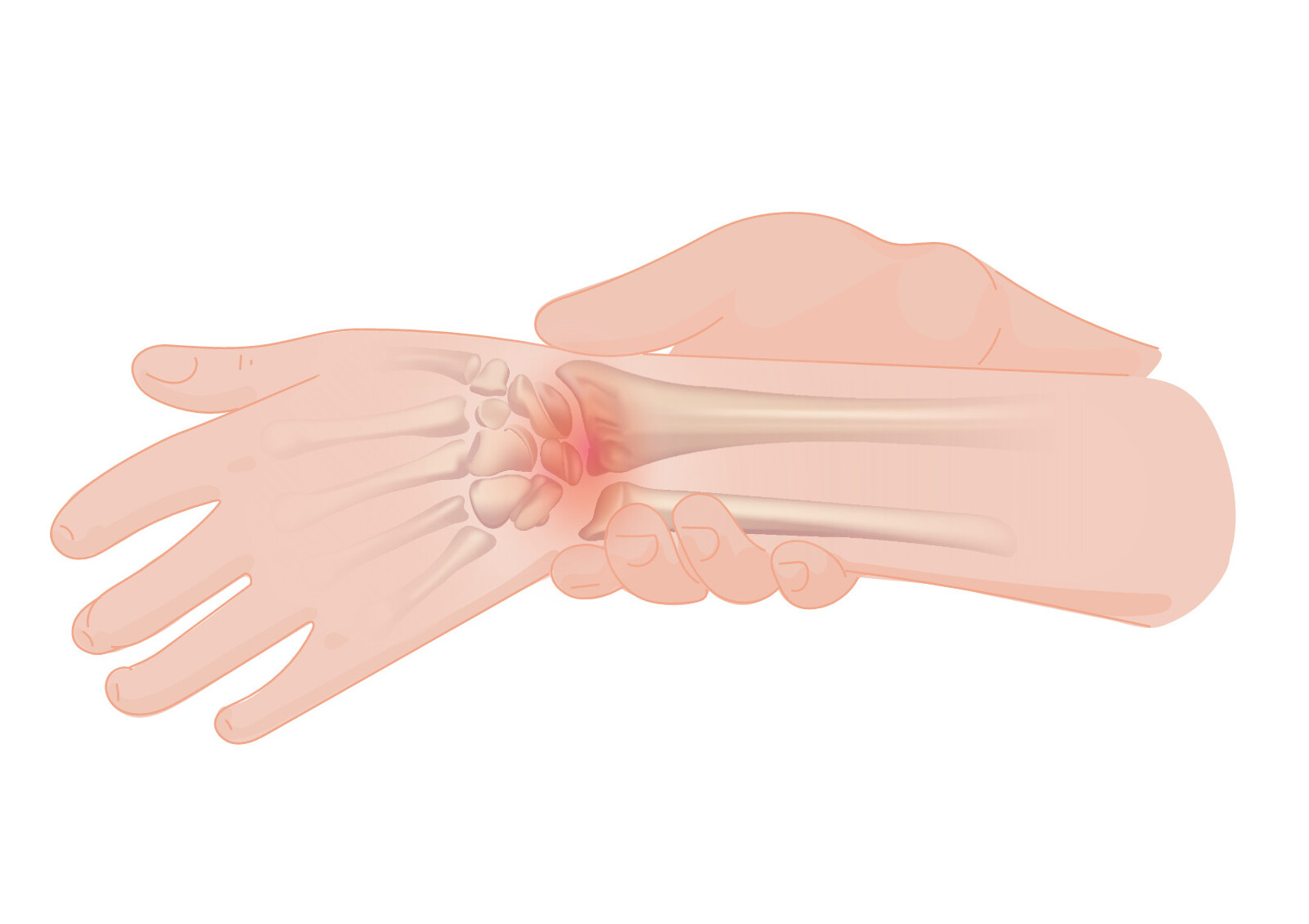
An illustration of wrist pain

Wrist pain is a pain in the area of the wrist. It most commonly results from an injury to a ligament. The pain may be sharp from a traumatic injury or from chronic repetitive wrist activities.

Pain may be caused after exerting the wrist, as may occur during weight lifting, in any weight-bearing or athletic activity, manual labor, or from injury to nerves, muscles, ligaments, tendons or bones of the wrist. Wrist pain may result from nerve compression, tendonitis, osteoarthritis or carpal tunnel syndrome.

== Structure and etiology ==
Wrist anatomy includes 20 individual ligaments attaching the eight carpal bones between the radius and ulna bones of the forearm and the metacarpal bones of the hand. Location and dynamic function of the wrist ligaments determine susceptibility to injury. Wrist structures prone to injury are the triangular fibrocartilage complex and the scapholunate ligament.

Wrist sprains may occur when a ligament is ruptured or lacerated in severe trauma, stretched or twisted. Commonly, wrist pain is caused by sudden load-bearing or twisting effects, such as falling from a height with an outstretched hand. Rupture of multiple wrist ligaments in a more severe event may require surgical repair.

Injury to and inflammation of the scapholunate ligament is a common wrist injury. Injuries to the triangular fibrocartilage complex may result from chronic repetitive movements by wrist flexion-extension, supination-pronation, or sudden radius-ulna rotation.

Osteoarthritis, typically in elderly people, and rheumatoid arthritis are other common causes of wrist pain.

== Types ==
Wrist pain can be a symptom of injury and several types of non-injury related conditions.

=== Non-injury ===
- De Quervain tenosynovitis (when two tendons that control movement of the thumb become constricted by their tendinous sheath in the wrist)
- Wrist osteoarthritis
  - Scapholunate advanced collapse
- Osteoarthritis at the base of the thumb
- Carpal tunnel syndrome
- Ganglion cyst is associated with minimal and specific pain, such as with forceful hyperextension (push up maneuver) or a dorsal wrist ganglion (fluid-filled closed sac with a joint or tendon sheath in the wrist)
- Extensor carpi ulnaris tendinopathy (triangular fibrocartilage)
- Kienbock's disease (breakdown of the lunate bone)
- Tendinopathy in the wrist (extensor) or thumb (De Quervain syndrome)
- Inflammatory arthritis
  - Rheumatoid arthritis

The hallmark symptom of carpal tunnel syndrome is tingling (paresthesia), which is not commonly associated with pain. Ulnar nerve entrapment at Guyon's canal causes weakness in specific muscles, but is not typically painful.

=== Injury ===
- Scaphoid fracture
- Scapholunate ligament injury
- Distal radioulnar joint instability
  - Triangular fibrocartilage complex (injury and degeneration)
- Distal radius fracture

== Prevalence ==
Wrist pain has a prevalence of 10-14% in the general population. It is highly prevalent in people performing physically demanding activities, such as manual laborers and athletes.

== Evaluation ==
The physical exam may show tenderness by palpation over the scapholunate ligament on the back of the wrist, immediately below the radius. Swelling and deformities are the two clinical signs associated with arthritis. The wrist is clinically tested by slight flexion while the physician feels the back of the wrist with the thumb. The physician may also test the range of motion by flexion, extension, radius, and ulna deviation, with normal ranges of 65-80 degrees of flexion, 55-75 degrees of extension, 30-45 degrees of ulna deviation, and 15-25 degrees of radius deviation. Conventional radiography may be used for detection of wrist bone pathologies.

== Treatment ==
After applying hot or cold pads in the first moments, if there is no inflammation, the use of a simple leather or neoprene wrist brace (or even a steel-reinforced one), is recommended in order to rest the wrist.

== Bibliography ==
- "Carpal Tunnel Syndrome Fact Sheet". National Institute of Neurological Disorders and Stroke. Archived from the original on December 9, 2004.
- "Symptoms". Carpal Tunnel Syndrome. Mayo Clinic.
