= Brunelli procedure =

- Specialty: Hand surgery
- ICD-9-CM: 81.7

The Brunelli Procedure is a surgical procedure that can be used to correct instability in the wrist. Instability in the wrist can be caused by a torn Scapholunate ligament. The Brunelli Procedure does not fix the torn ligament. A hole is drilled through the Scaphoid bone and a part of a tendon taken from the patient is put through this hole and attached to the nearby bones. The procedure usually results in reduced movement of the wrist. Instability in the wrist can, over time, lead to wrist osteoarthritis.
