= Scapholunate advanced collapse =

Type of wrist osteoarthritis

- Other names: SLAC wrist
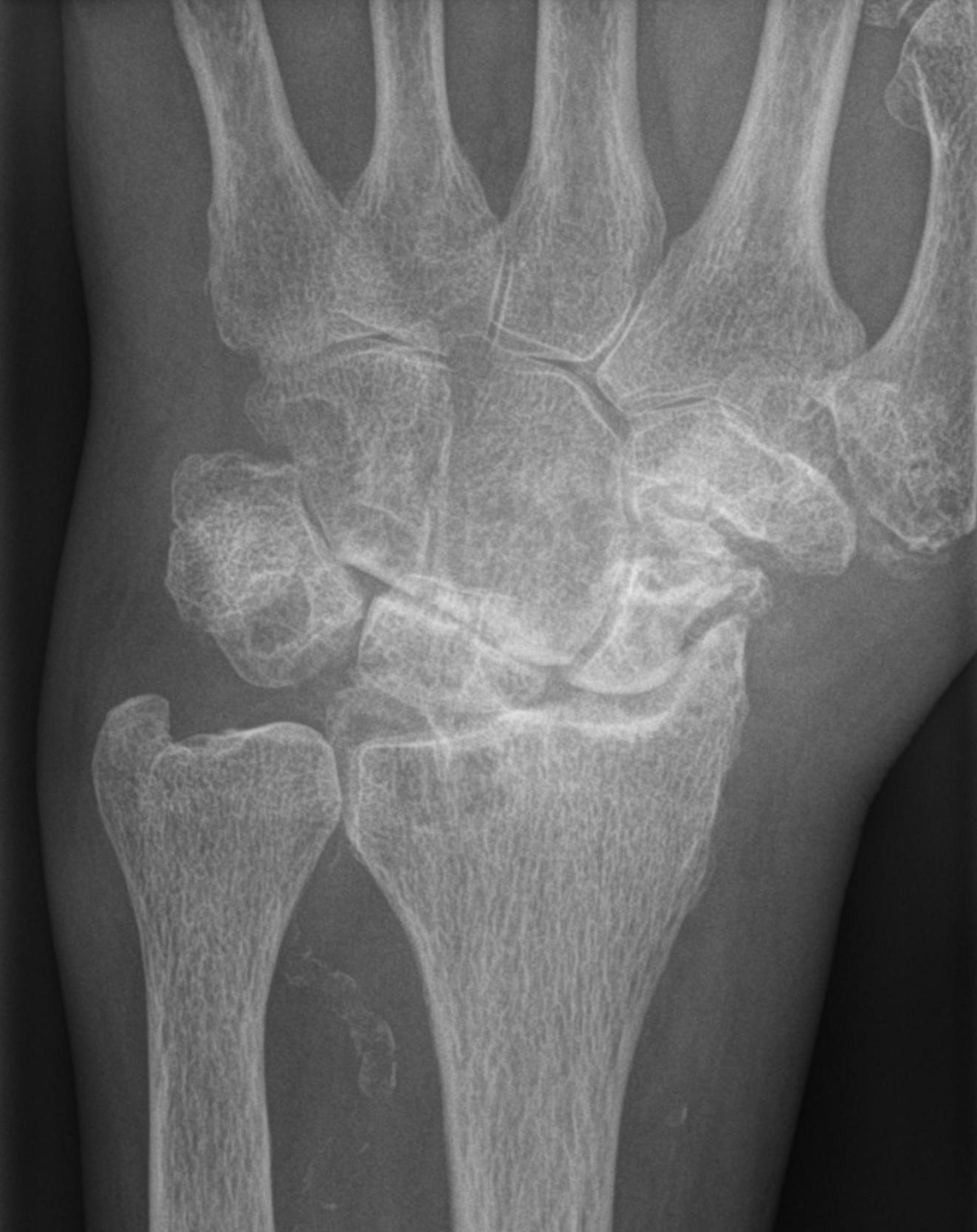
- AP wrist x-ray demonstrating Stage III scapholunate advanced collapse
- Specialty: Orthopedic surgery
- Risk factors: Wrist trauma
- Diagnostic method: Radiographic
- Differential diagnosis: Scaphoid fracture, distal radial fractures, avascular necrosis of the scaphoid, gout, pseudogout, rheumatoid arthritis, Kienbock disease, lunate fracture vs dislocation dorsal intercalated segmental instability
- Treatment: Non-surgical and surgical (fusion, joint replacement)

Scapholunate advanced collapse (also known as SLAC wrist) is a type of wrist osteoarthritis. SLAC wrist is the most common type of post-traumatic wrist osteoarthritis and is often the result of an undiagnosed or untreated scapholunate ligament rupture. The condition follows a predictable pattern of development, which was first described by H. Kirk Watson, M.D. and Frederick L. Ballet, M.D. in 1984. Diagnosis is made using wrist x-rays, and supported by certain provocative tests. Management depends on the stage at the time of diagnosis but includes both non-surgical and surgical options.

== Signs and symptoms ==
Common signs and symptoms of SLAC wrist include wrist pain with heavy use, grip strength weakness, and mild to moderate wrist swelling.

== Diagnosis ==
Scapholunate advanced collapse is a radiographic diagnosis. The Watson and Ballet classification identifies three stages of progressive wrist osteoarthritis that can be identified on a standard posterior-anterior (PA) wrist x-ray.

=== Stage I ===
Stage I SLAC wrist involves the distal radioscaphoid joint. The PA wrist x-ray will demonstrate radial styloid beaking (or localized scaphoid fossa arthrosis beginning at the radial styloid tip) and sclerosis and joint space narrowing of the radioscaphoid joint.

=== Stage II ===
Stage II SLAC wrist involves the entire radioscaphoid joint. The PA wrist x-ray will demonstrate sclerosis and joint space narrowing between the entire radioscaphoid joint.

=== Stage III ===
Stage III SLAC wrist involves the entire radioscaphoid joint and the capitolunate joint. The PA wrist x-ray will demonstrate sclerosis and joint space narrowing between the lunate and capitate. Over time, the capitate will migrate proximally into the space created by the scapholunate dissociation. The radiographic findings in Stage III SLAC wrist are synonymous with the Terry-Thomas sign, indicating complete scapholunate dissociation.

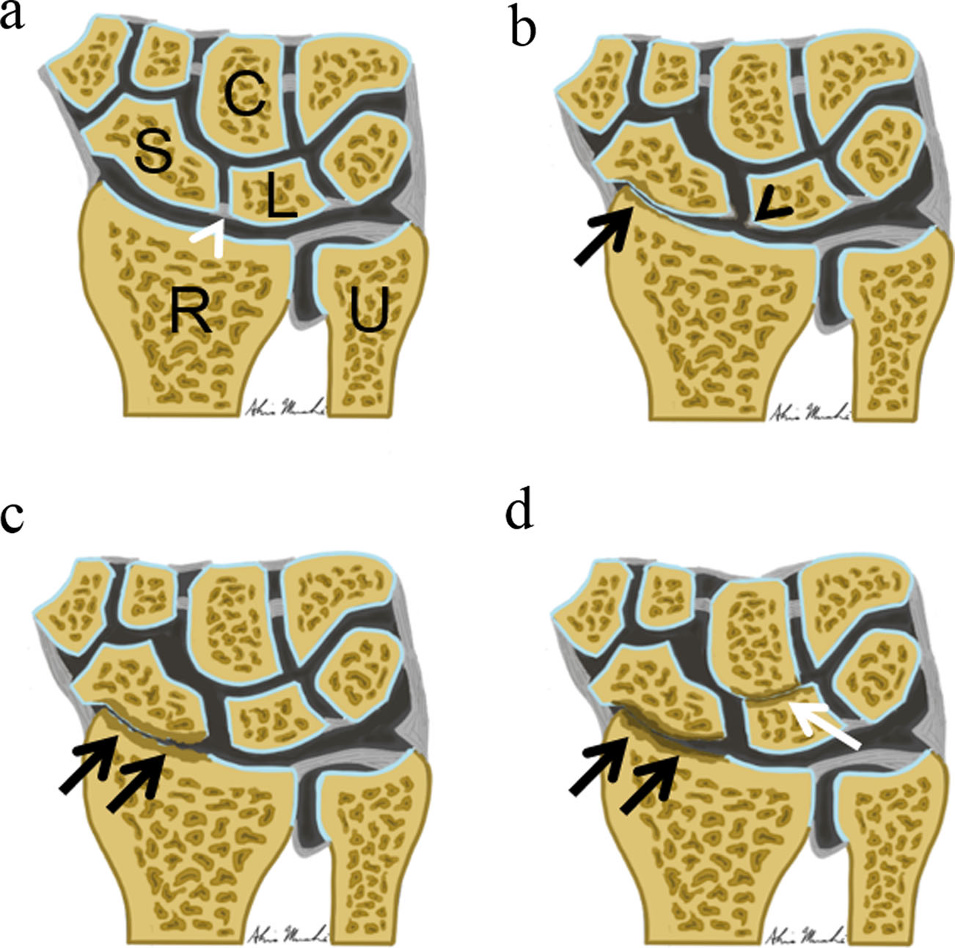
Anatomic illustrations of the wrist depicting the progressive stages of scapholunate advanced collapse. (A) Normal wrist demonstrating an intact scapholunate ligament (white arrowhead), normal scapholunate interval, and preservation of the joint spaces. (S = scaphoid, L = lunate, C = capitate, R = radius, U = ulna). (B) Stage I SLAC wrist: Scapholunate ligament tear (black arrowhead) with mild widening of the scapholunate interval and early osteoarthritic changes involving the most radial portion of the radioscaphoid joint (black arrow). (C) Stage II SLAC wrist: Worsening osteoarthritic changes involving the entire radioscaphoid joint (black arrows) and increased widening of the scapholunate interval. (D) Stage III SLAC wrist: Worsening radioscaphoid joint osteoarthritic changes (black arrows), narrowing of the capitolunate joint space, and associated osteoarthritic changes (white arrow). This stage will eventually progress to further proximal migration of the capitate.

Diagnosis may be aided by certain provocative tests, including the scaphoid shift (Watson) test or the scaphoid ballotment test. These tests do not confirm the presence of SLAC wrist, but positive test may indicate instability of the scapholunate ligament.

== Management ==
The management and treatment of SLAC wrist depends on the stage at the time of diagnosis. The options for management can be separated into two broad categories: non-surgical and surgical. Less advanced SLAC wrist may be managed initially with non-surgical options including nonsteroidal anti-inflammatory drugs, wrist splinting, and steroid injections. More advanced stages of SLAC wrist or SLAC wrist that is refractory to non-surgical management may be treated with surgical options including radial styloidectomy, proximal row carpectomy, scaphoid excision and four-corner fusion, wrist fusion, or wrist replacement (arthroplasty).

== Epidemiology ==
In their initial study, Watson and Ballet identified SLAC wrist as the most common form of wrist osteoarthritis, occurring in 57% of 210 patients with wrist osteoarthritis. SLAC wrist is more common in males, manual laborers, young people, and patients with a history of wrist trauma.
