= Disi =

Disi may refer to:

- Defence & International Security Institute, a non-profit, non-partisan, semi-public institution dedicated to informing the public about science and policy issues affecting international security and defence.
- Direct Injection Spark Ignition, an engine fuel management technology by Mazda
- Emilio Disi, an Argentine actor
- Disi is the 10th chakra (group) of 6 musical scales, into which the seventy two basic scales, or Melakarta rāgas, of Carnatic music are classified.
- Disi aquifer is a vital source of water in the arid southern region of Jordan. The aquifer is shared with the Kingdom of Saudi Arabia. In the past this non renewable source was used to irrigate wheat in the Saudi desert in largely in the Tabuk region. More recent the government of Jordan embarked on the Disi Water Conveyance Project to provide drinking water to the largest population in the capital Amman.
- Dorsal intercalated segment instability deformity of the hand
- Prydniprovska State Academy of Civil Engineering and Architecture, formerly Dnipropetrovsk Civil Engineering Institute (abbr. DISI)
