= Chauffeur's fracture =

- Other names: Hutchinson fracture, backfire fracture
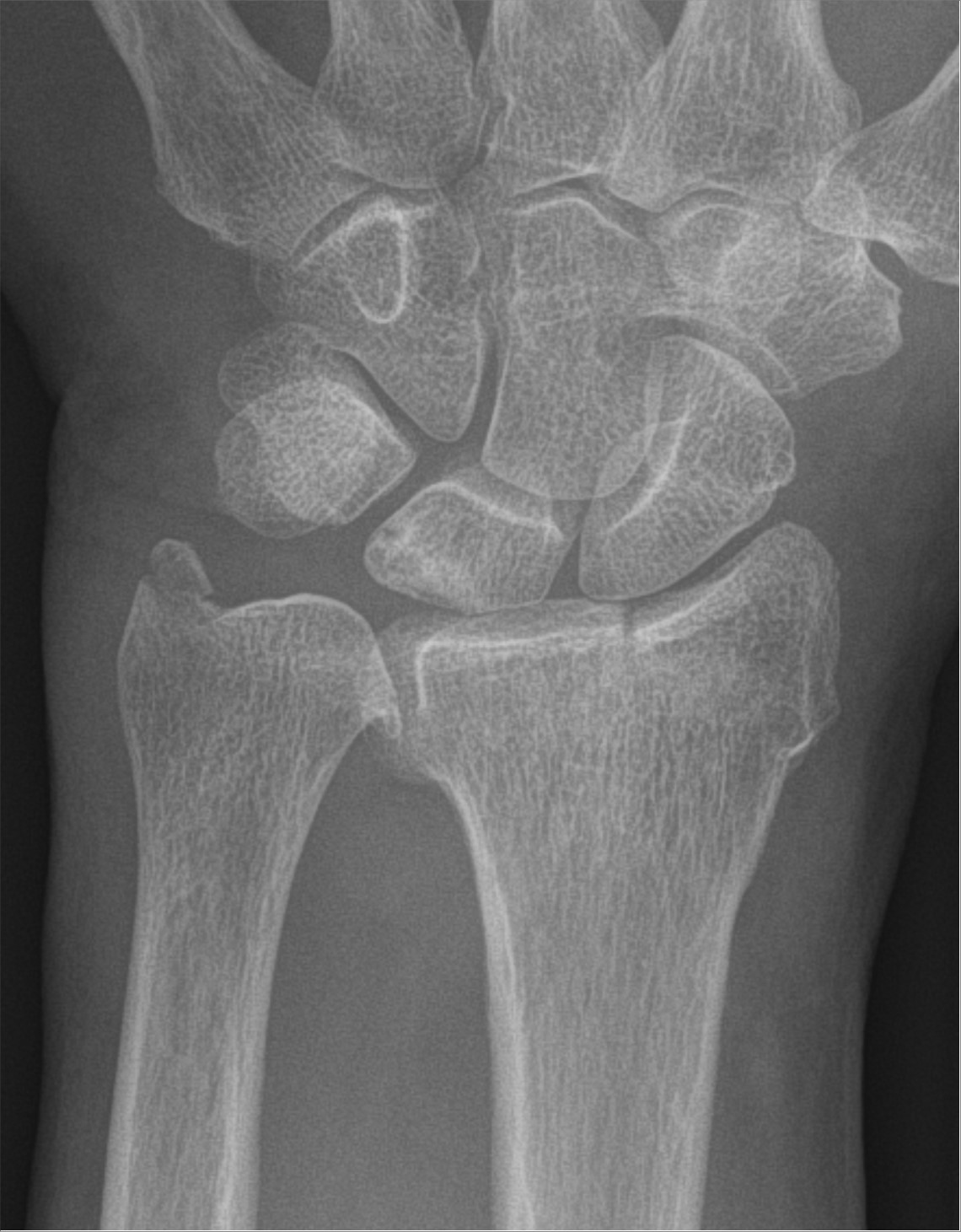
- Fracture of the radial styloid process with the fracture line extending into the intraarticular surface
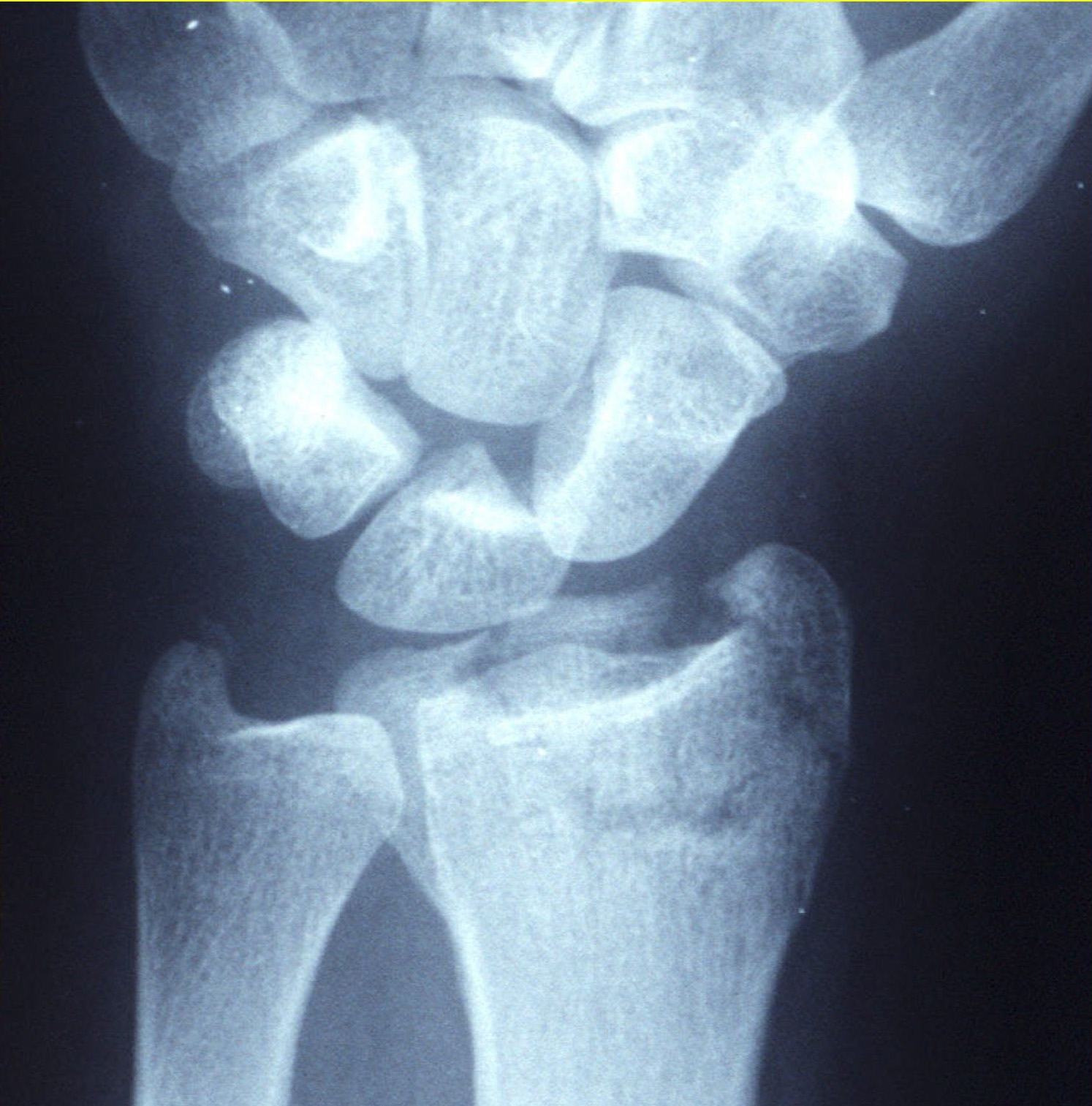
- X-ray of a displaced intra-articular distal radius fracture in an external fixator. The articular surface is widely displaced and irregular. This is a Chauffeur's fracture. Frykman class 3.
- Specialty: Orthopedics

Chauffeur's fracture, also known as Hutchinson fracture, is a type of intraarticular oblique fracture of the radial styloid process in the forearm. The injury is typically caused by compression of the scaphoid bone of the hand against the styloid process of the distal radius. It can be caused by falling onto an outstretched hand. Treatment is often open reduction and internal fixation, which is surgical realignment of the bone fragments and fixation with pins, screws, or plates.

== History ==
Jonathan Hutchinson first described Chauffeur's fracture in 1866. The term "Chauffeur's fracture" originated from Just Lucas-Championnière in 1904. The name originates from early chauffeurs, who sustained these injuries when the car back-fired while the chauffeur was hand-cranking to start the car. The back-fire forced the crank backward into the chauffeur's palm and produced the characteristic styloid fracture.
