= Radiocarpal ligament =

Radiocarpal ligament can refer to:

- Dorsal radiocarpal ligament (ligamentum radiocarpale dorsale)
- Palmar radiocarpal ligament (ligamentum radiocarpale palmare)
