= Wrist osteoarthritis =

- Other names: Osteoarthritis of the wrist
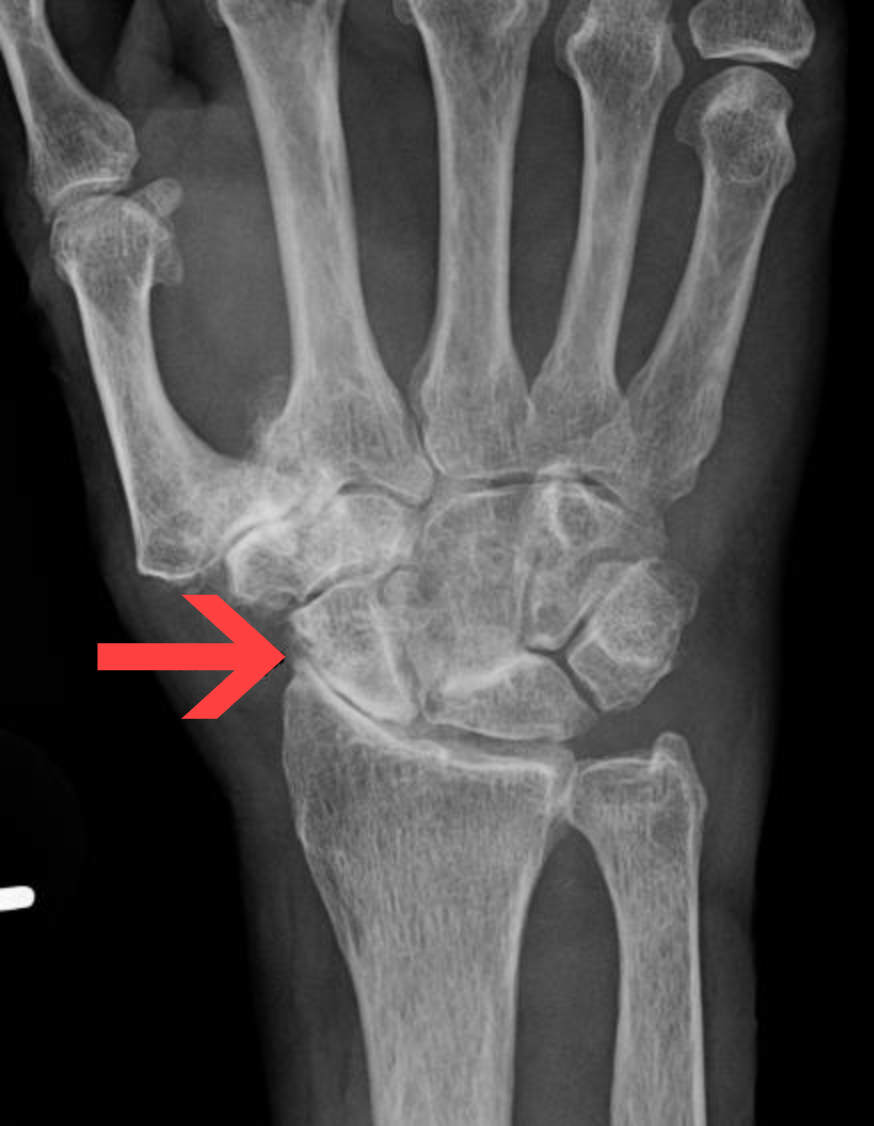
- Osteoarthritis within the wrist as seen on plain X-ray
- Specialty: Orthopedics

Wrist osteoarthritis is gradual loss of articular cartilage and hypertrophic bone changes (osteophytes). While in many joints this is part of normal aging (senescence), in the wrist osteoarthritis usually occurs over years to decades after scapholunate interosseous ligament rupture or an unhealed fracture of the scaphoid. Characteristic symptoms including pain, deformity and stiffness. Pain intensity and incapability (limited function) are notably variable and do not correspond with arthritis severity on radiographs.

Osteoarthritis of the wrist can be idiopathic, but it is mostly seen as a post-traumatic condition. There are different types of post-traumatic osteoarthritis. Scapholunate advanced collapse (SLAC) is the most common form, followed by scaphoid non-union advanced collapse (SNAC). Other post-traumatic causes such as intra-articular fractures of the distal radius or ulna can also lead to wrist osteoarthritis but are less common.

== Types ==
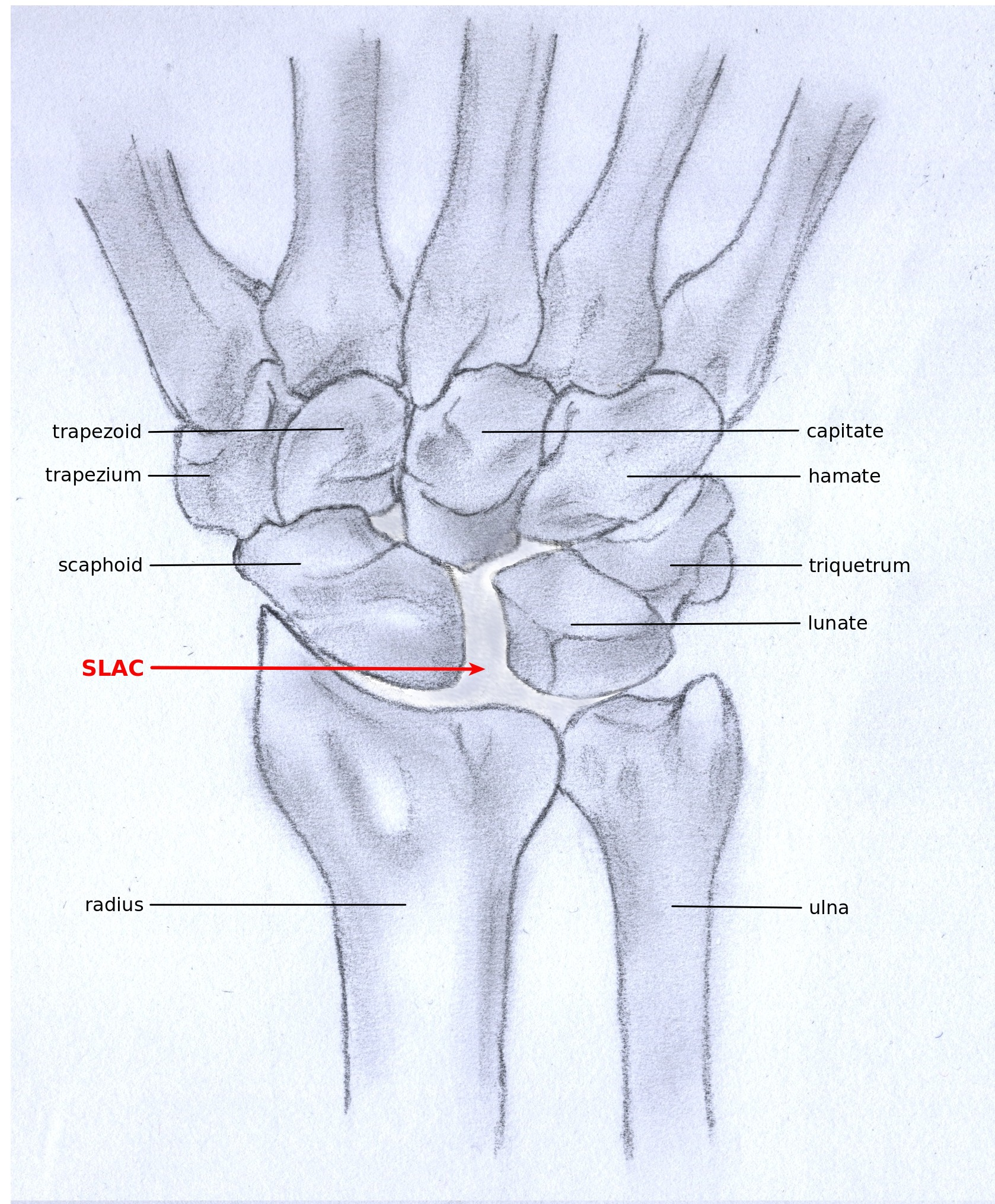
Scapholunate advanced collapse

SLAC and SNAC are two patterns of wrist osteoarthritis, following predictable patterns depending on the type of underlying injury. SLAC is caused by scapholunate ligament rupture, and SNAC is caused by a scaphoid fracture which does not heal non-union.

SLAC is more common than SNAC; 55% of the patients with wrist osteoarthritis have a SLAC wrist.

=== SLAC ===
Scapholunate advanced collapse (SLAC) is a predictable pattern of wrist osteoarthritis that results from untreated long-standing scapholunate ligament rupture and the associated carpal malalignment. The misalignment is described as dorsal intercalated segment instability (DISI) which is where the lunate angulates towards the dorsal side of the hand.

=== SNAC ===
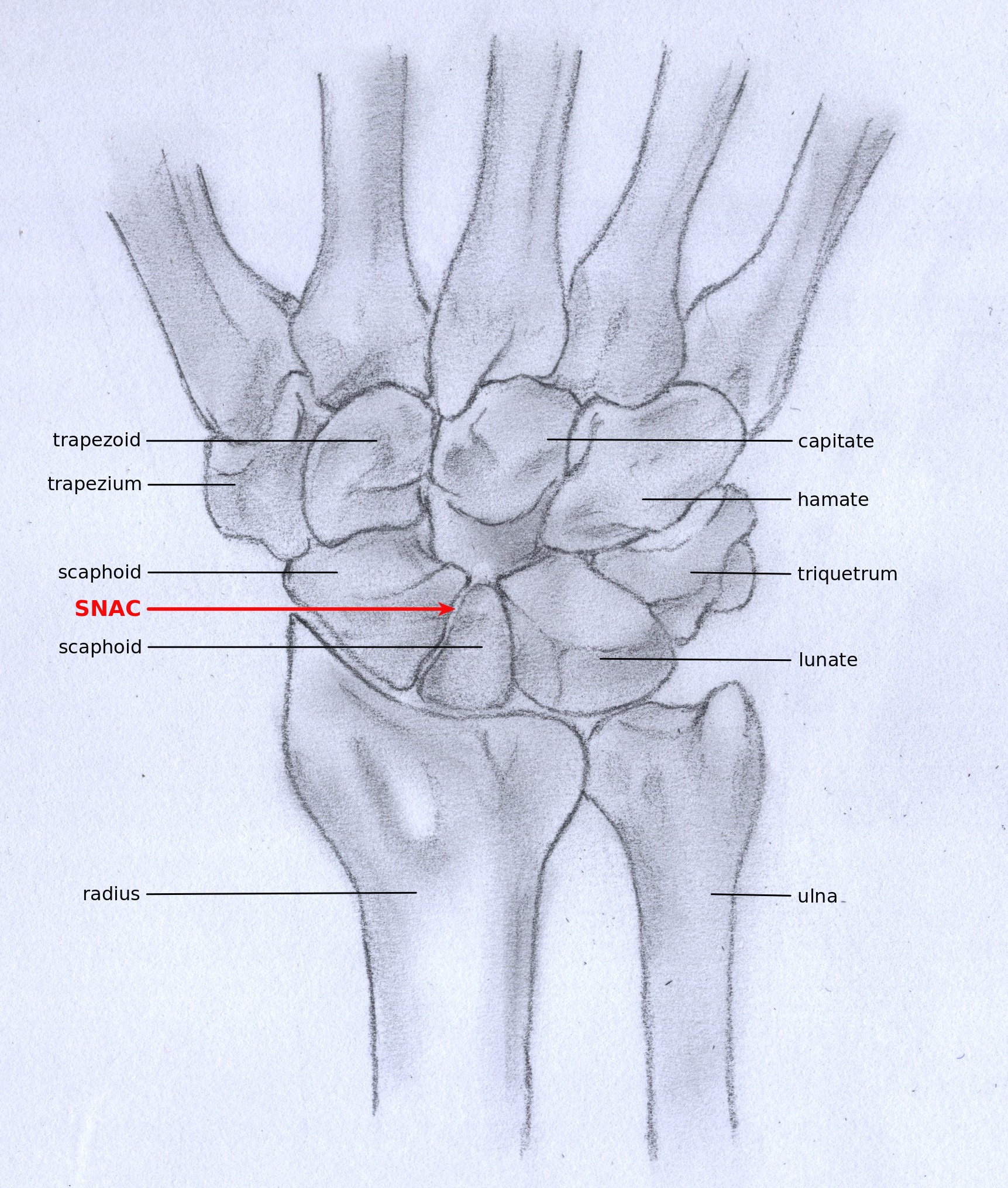
Scaphoid nonunion advanced collapse

Scaphoid fracture non-union changes the shape of the scaphoid bone and results in DISI malalignment. Scaphoid Non-union Advanced collapse (SNAC) is the pattern of osteoarthritis that develops in relation to the malalignment.

=== Stages ===
Post-traumatic osteoarthritis can be classified into four stages. These stages are similar between SLAC and SNAC wrists. Each stage has a different treatment.

- Stage I: the osteoarthritis is only localized in the distal scaphoid and radial styloid.
- Stage II: the osteoarthritis is localized in the radioscaphoid joint (distal to the fracture for SNAC; entire joint for SLAC).
- Stage III: the osteoarthritis is also localized in the capitolunate joint.
- Stage IV: the osteoarthritis is also located in the radiolunate articulation.
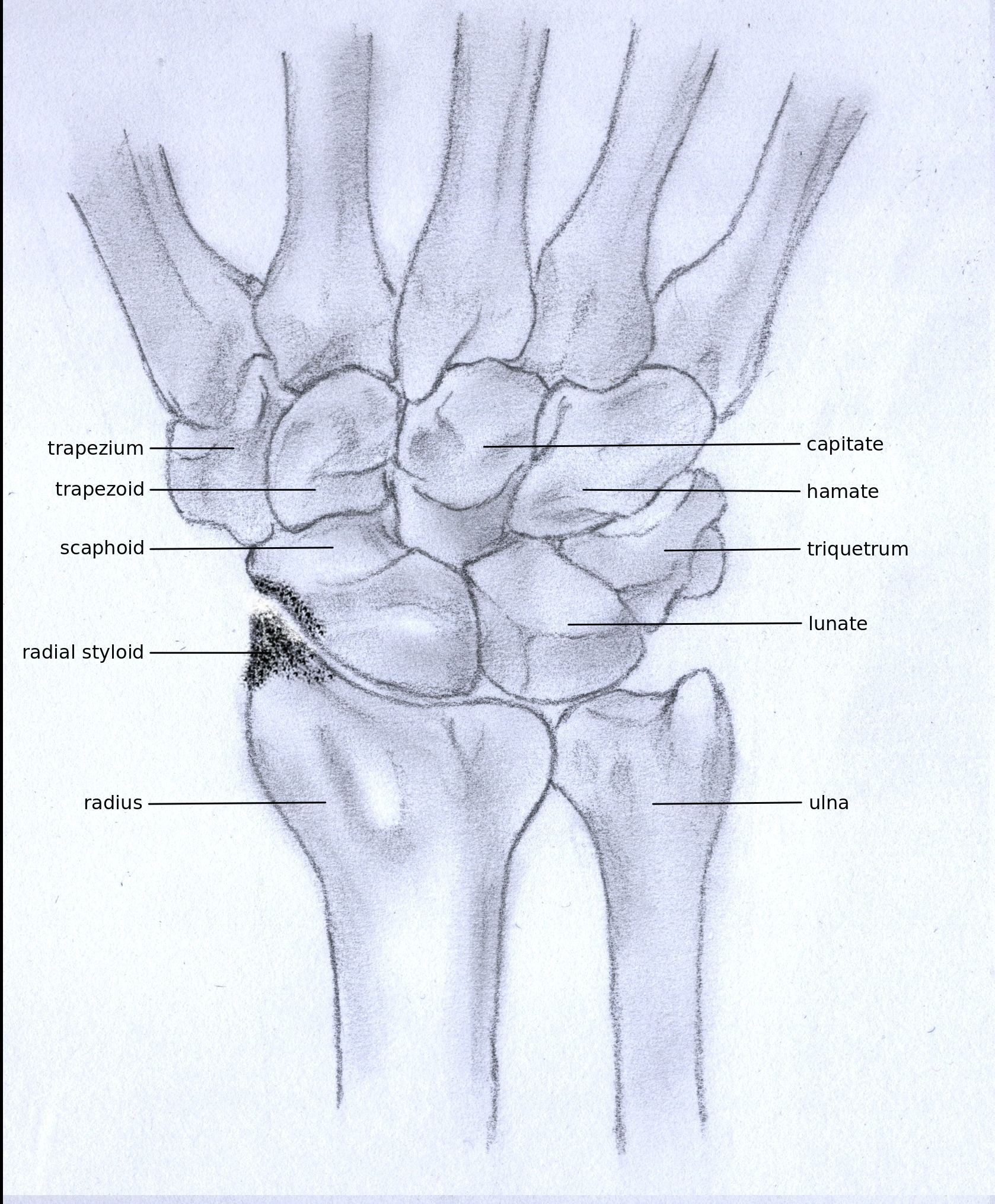
Stage I

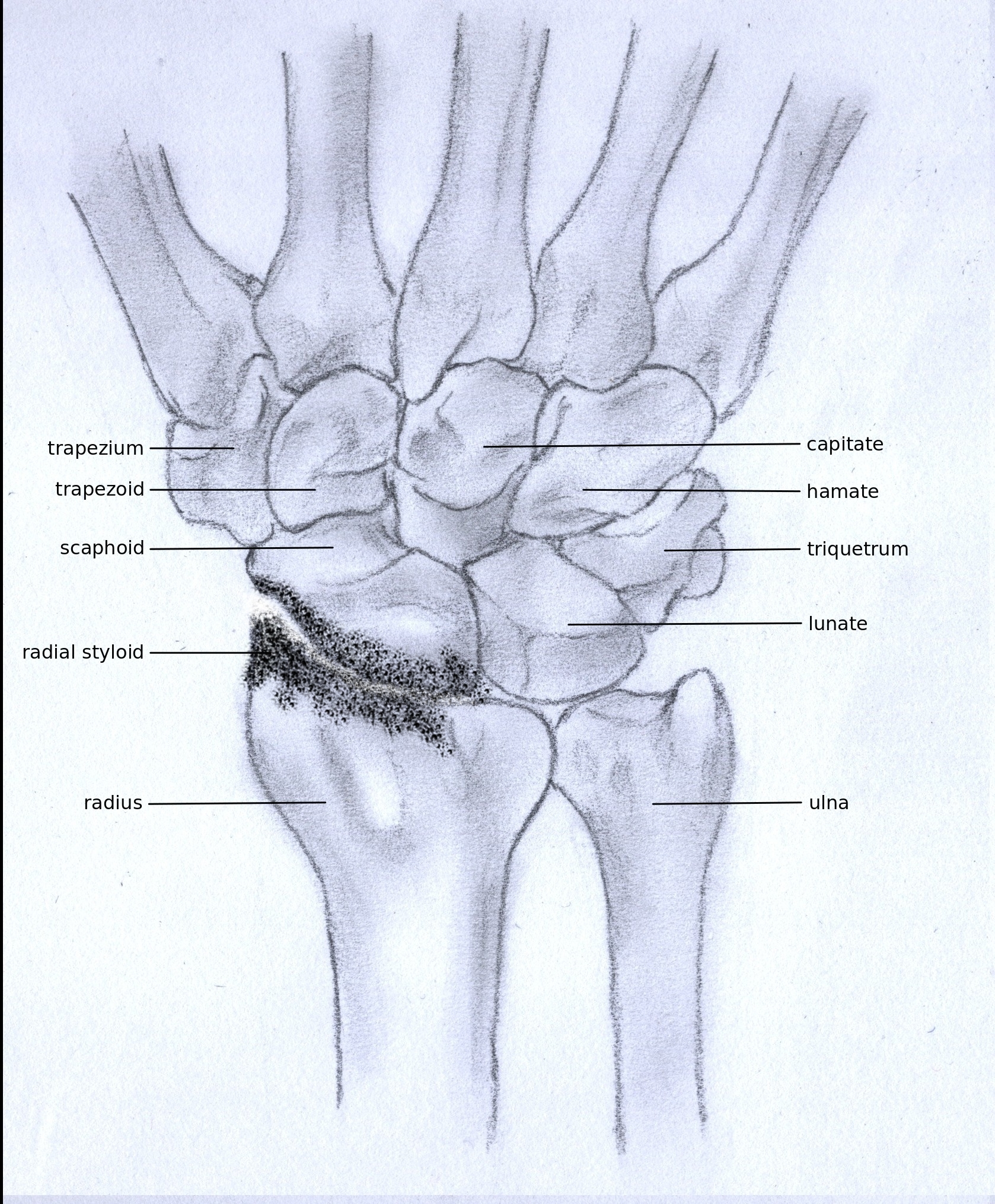
Stage II

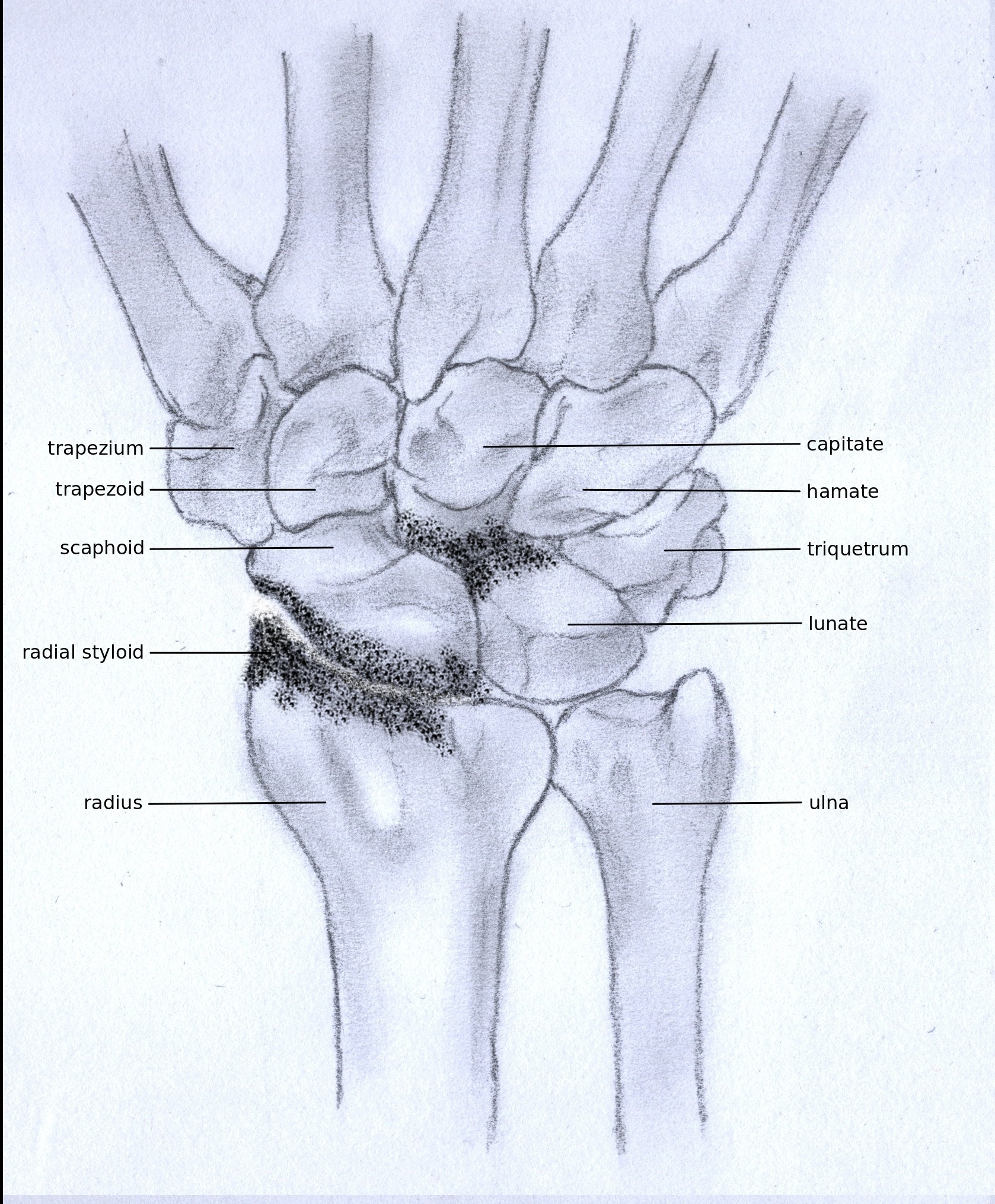
Stage III

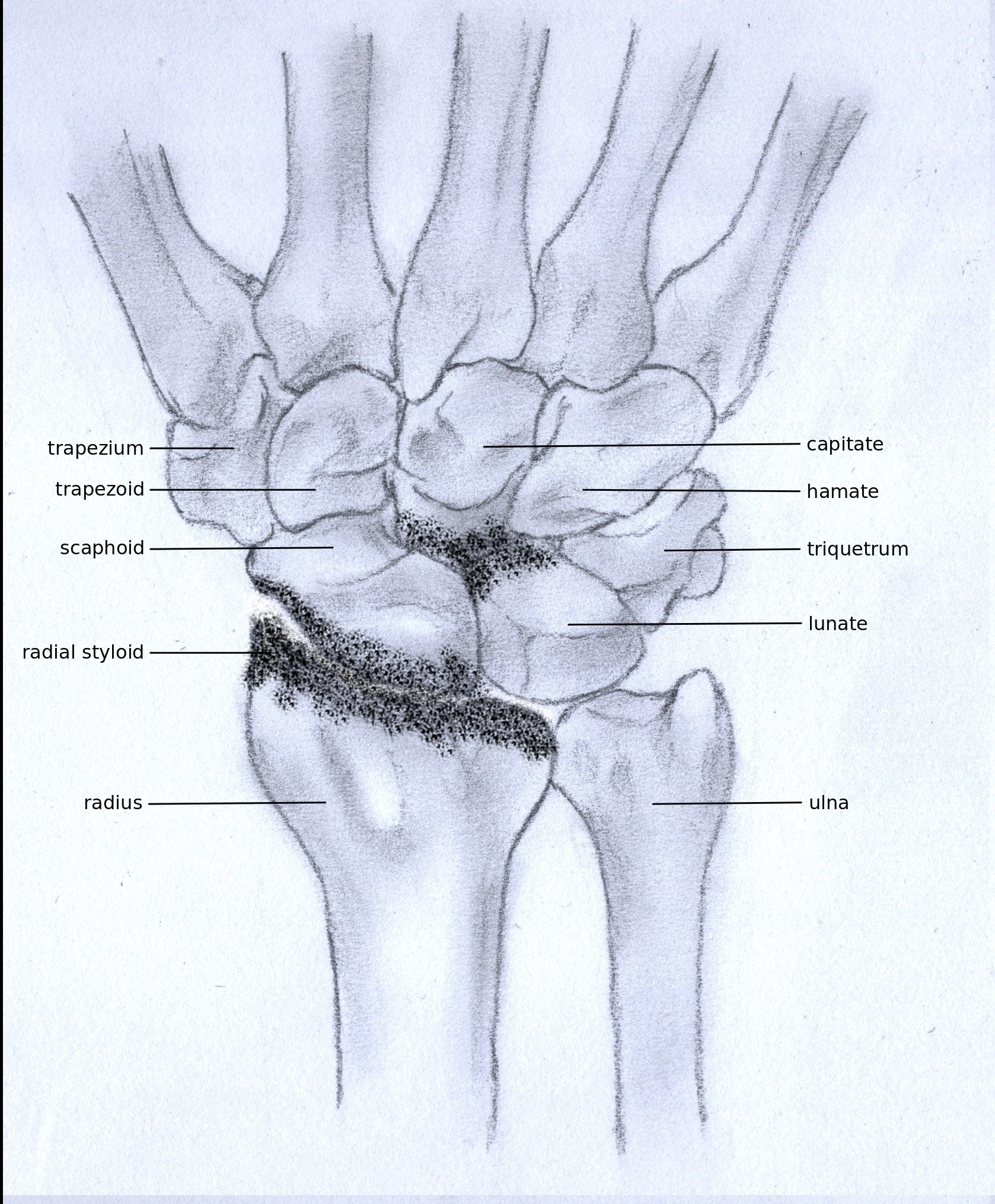
Stage IV

== Signs and symptoms ==
The most common initial presenting symptom of wrist osteoarthritis is joint pain. Other signs and symptoms, as with any joint affected by osteoarthritis, include:

- Loss of motion stiffness, which can be worse after a period of rest, such as when one awakes in the morning.
- Deformity of the wrist. There is a characteristic dorsal radial fullness related to osteophytes and joint effusion.
- Crepitus (crackling), which is felt when the wrist is moved passively.

These symptoms can lead to loss of function and less daily activity.

== Mechanism ==
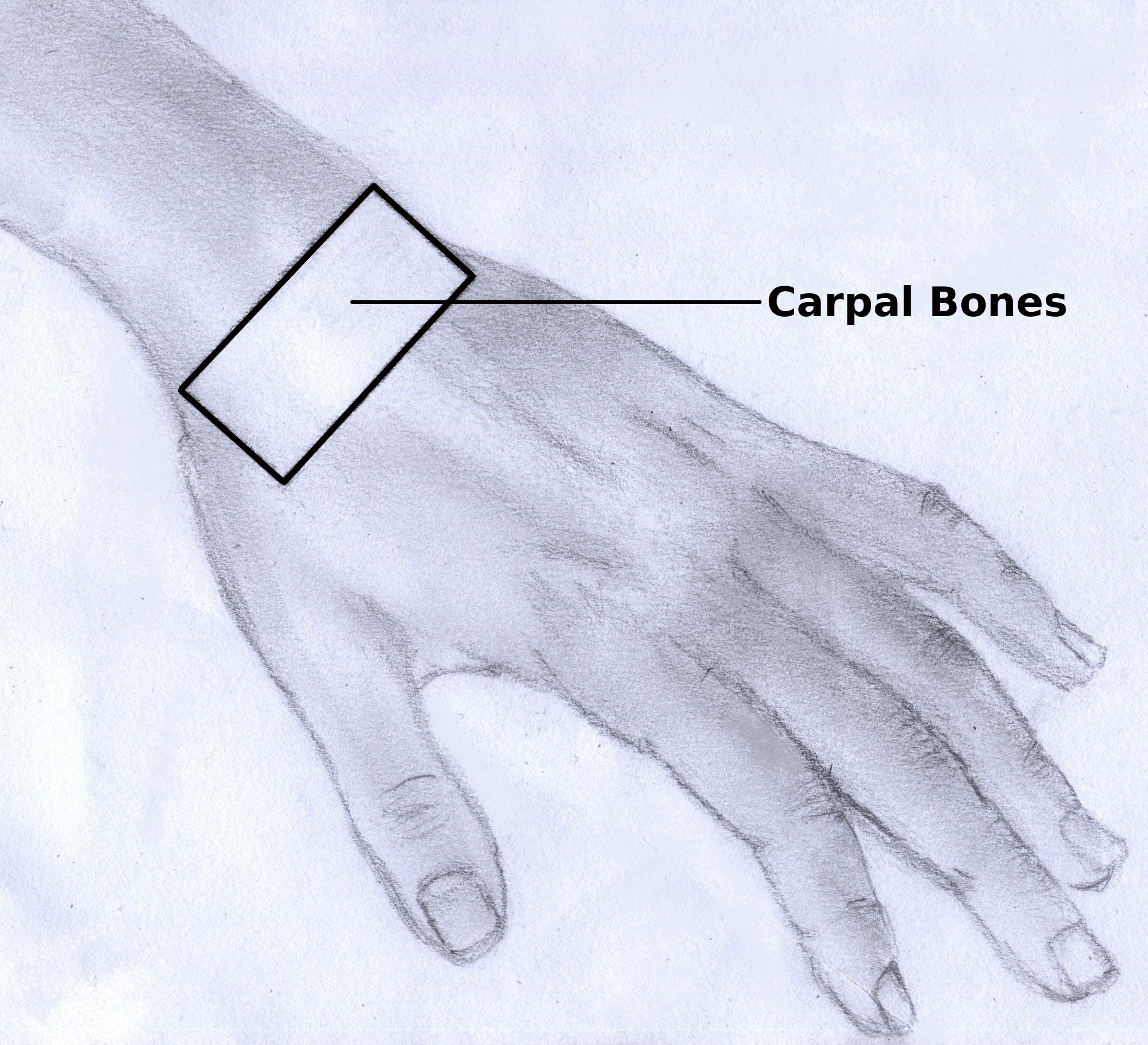

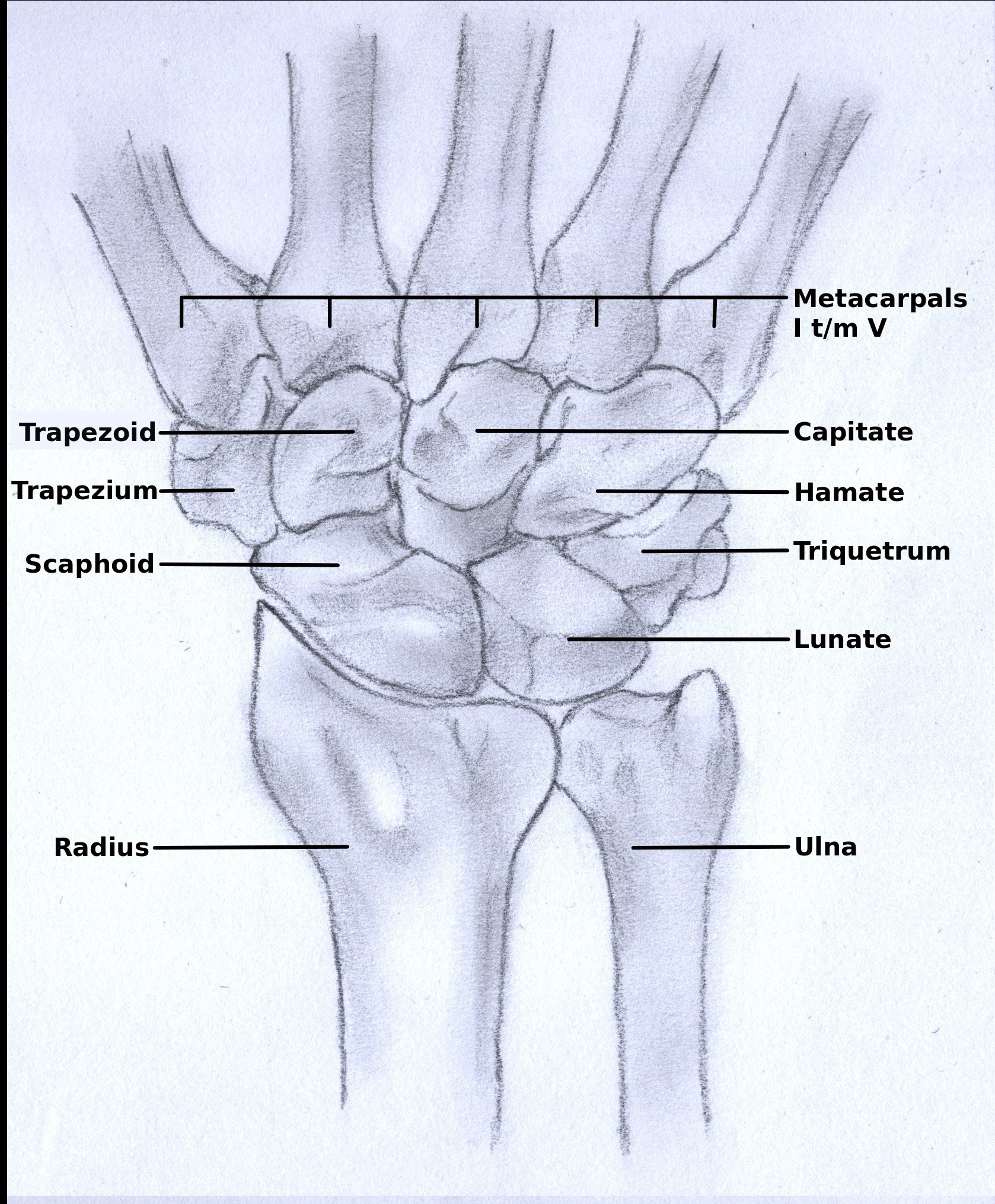
Anatomy wrist

In order to understand the cause of post-traumatic wrist osteoarthritis it is important to know and understand the anatomy of the wrist. The hand is subdivided into three parts:

- Wrist
- Metacarpus
- Digits

The wrist consists of eight small carpal bones. Each of these carpal bones has a different size and shape. They contribute towards the stability of the wrist and are ranked in two rows, each consisting of four bones.

=== Proximal row ===
From lateral to medial and when viewed from anterior, the proximal row is formed by the:

- Scaphoid
- Lunate
- Triquetral
- Pisiform

=== Distal row ===
From lateral to medial and when viewed from anterior, the distal row is formed by the:

- Trapezium
- Trapezoid
- Capitate
- Hamate

== Diagnosis ==
Osteoarthritis of the wrist is predominantly a clinical diagnosis, and thus is primarily based on the patients medical history, physical examination and wrist radiographs (X-rays).

=== Medical history ===
The person may or may not recall an old wrist injury.

=== Physical examination ===
Examination may identify limited passive wrist motion, pain at the extremes of wrist motion, tenderness at the radioscaphoid joint, and dorsal radial prominence. Activities that use forceful wrist extension such as rising from a chair or push-ups may be painful.
In the absence of gout, chondrocalcinosis, rheumatoid arthritis, or prior distal radius fracture, a person with gradual onset limited motion and pain in the wrist likely has wrist osteoarthritis.

=== Radiographs (made with X-rays) ===
Radiographs can confirm the diagnosis of wrist osteoarthritis. The earliest sign is narrowing of the joint space between the radius and the scaphoid and an osteophyte off the tip of the radial styloid.

SLAC

Because SLAC results from scapholunate ligament rupture, there is a larger space between the two bones, also known as the Terry Thomas sign. Scaphoid instability due to the ligament rupture can be static or dynamic. When the X-ray is diagnostic and there is a convincing Terry Thomas sign it is a static scaphoid instability. When the scaphoid is made unstable by either the patient or by manipulation by the examining physician it is a dynamic instability.

SNAC

In order to diagnose a SNAC wrist you need a PA view X-ray and a lateral view X-ray. As in SLAC, the lateral view X-ray is performed to see if there is a DISI. Computed tomography (CT) or Magnetic Resonance Imaging (MRI) are rarely used to diagnose SNAC or SLAC wrist osteoarthritis because there is no additional value. Also, these techniques are much more expensive than a standard X-ray. CT or MRI may be used if there is a strong suspicion for another underlying pathology or disease.

== Treatment ==
Post-traumatic wrist osteoarthritis can be accommodated. A wrist splint, ice, acetaminophen, and NSAIDs may alleviate symptoms. Surgery to change the wrist anatomy to attempt to alleviate pain is an option.

Corticosteroids provide, at best, temporary alleviation of discomfort. And corticosteroid injection harms cartilage. People with good remaining cartilage should be cautious with corticosteroid injection.

=== Surgical Treatment Options ===
It's unusual for people to choose surgery for mild to moderate arthritis. One surgical option is neurectomy of the anterior and posterior interosseous nerves. Neurectomy is not proved better than placebo (simulate/sham) neurectomy and may not be worth the operative harm risks if it has no specific treatment effect.

Radial styloidectomy is a surgical treatment option when there is only radioscaphoid arthritis (Stage I), in which the radial styloid is surgically removed from the distal radius.

=== Stage II ===
The surgical options for stage II and III wrist osteoarthritis are excision of some of the bones with or without fusion (arthrodesis) of the others. The idea is to try to alleviate pain while maintaining some wrist motion.

One technique is to remove one row of carpal bones. The bones closer to the forearm (proximal) are removed: scaphoid, lunate, and triquetrum. It is important that the radioscaphocapitate ligament is left intact, because if the ligament is not preserved the capitate bone will translate to the ulnar side of the wrist and move away from the distal radius.

The new articulation of the capitate with the lunate fossa of the distal radius is not as congruent as the former scaphoid-lunate-radius joint. This and other issues contribute to potential to develop arthritis over the years. In part based on these concerns, some surgeon prefer to maintain the lunate in patients younger than 40 years proximal row carpectomy.

A surgery called four-corner arthrodesis is an option. The capitate, lunate, hamate and triquetrum are fused together in this procedure and the scaphoid is excised. Before the arthrodesis is executed, the lunate must be reduced out of DISI position. Because the radiolunate joint is typically preserved in stage II SLAC and SNAC wrists, this joint can be the only remaining joint of the proximal wrist. Both procedures are often combined with wrist denervation, as described in the text of treatment stage I.

=== Stage III ===
In Stage III wrist osteoarthritis, some surgeons offer patients proximal row carpectomy and interpose some of the wrist capsule to account for the arthritis in the capitate. Four-corner arthrodesis, as described above in stage II, is also an option.

=== Stage IV ===
In this stage there are two surgical treatment options; total wrist arthroplasty and total wrist arthrodesis. Total wrist arthrodesis is the standard surgical treatment for patients with stage IV wrist osteoarthritis. During this procedure the carpal bones are all fused together and are then fastened to the distal radius. This procedure eliminates all wrist motion, but heavy labor is still possible.

An option for people who want to maintain some motion, and are willing to avoid using force with the hand, is total wrist arthroplasty. There is some evidence that patients with a total wrist arthrodesis on one side and a total wrist arthroplasty on the other, prefer the total wrist arthroplasty. The procedure exists of a couple of elements. First, the proximal row is removed and the distal row is fastened to the metacarpals. Then, one side of the arthroplasty is placed upon the distal row and the other side on the distal radius. Additionally, the head of the ulna is removed. Arthroplasty can have problems that may lead to another surgery.
