= Radial collateral ligament of wrist joint =

Ligament of the wrist

Radial collateral ligament (wrist)
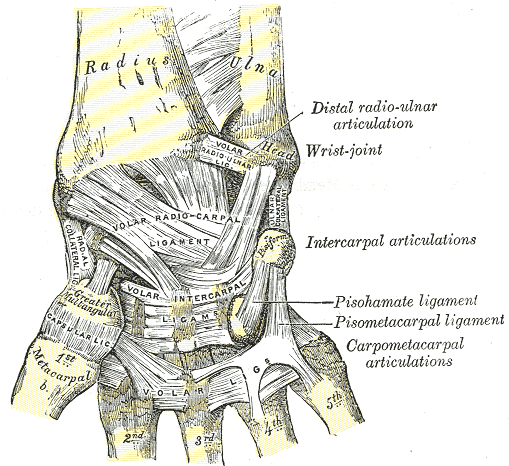
- Ligaments of wrist. Anterior view. (Radial collateral visible at center left.)

Details
- From: Radial styloid process
- To: Lateral scaphoid and trapezium

Identifiers
- Latin: ligamentum collaterale carpi radiale
- TA98: A03.5.11.008
- TA2: 1801
- FMA: 40006

The radial collateral ligament (external lateral ligament, radial carpal collateral ligament) extends from the tip of the styloid process of the radius and attaches to the radial side of the scaphoid (formerly navicular bone of the hand), immediately adjacent to its proximal articular surface and some fibres extend to the lateral side of the trapezium (greater multangular bone).

It is in relation with the radial artery, which separates the ligament from the tendons of the Abductor pollicis longus and extensor pollicis brevis.

The radial collateral ligament's role is to limit ulnar deviation at the wrist.
