= Carpal collateral ligament =

Carpal collateral ligament may refer to:

- Ulnar carpal collateral ligament
- Radial carpal collateral ligament
