= Dorsal intercalated segment instability =

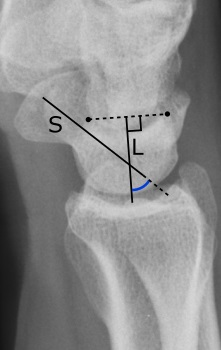
The SL angle is an indicator of dorsal intercalated segment instability deformity (DISI). The SL angle goes between: A line through the long axis of the scaphoid bone.; A line perpendicular to the distal articular surface of the lunate bone.; It should normally be 30°-60°.

Dorsal intercalated segment instability (DISI) is a deformity of the wrist where the lunate bone angulates to the dorsal side of the hand.

== Causes ==
The main cause of DISI is wrist trauma, with or without a fracture:

- Scaphoid fracture: bony DISI
- Distal radius fracture: compensatory DISI
- Malunion of radius fracture: adaptive DISI
- Scapholunate ligament instability: ligamentous DISI
