= Palmar radiocarpal ligament =

Ligament of the wrist

Volar radiocarpal ligament
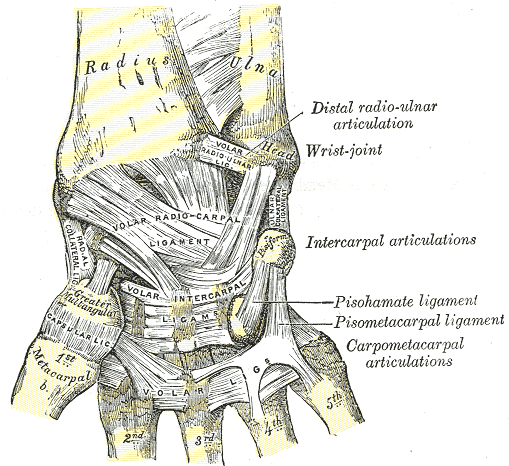
- Ligaments of wrist. Anterior view. (Volar radiocarpal visible at center.)

Details
- From: Radius
- To: Proximal carpals, capitate

Identifiers
- Latin: ligamentum radiocarpeum palmare
- TA98: A03.5.11.004
- TA2: 1788
- FMA: 40002

The palmar radiocarpal ligament (anterior ligament, volar radiocarpal ligament) is a broad membranous band, attached above to the distal end of the radius, and passing downward to the scaphoid, lunate, triquetrum and capitate of the carpal bones in the wrist.

In addition to this broad membrane, there is a rounded fasciculus, superficial to the rest, which reaches from the base of the styloid process of the ulna to the lunate and triangular bones.

== Perforations ==
The ligament is perforated by apertures for the passage of vessels,

== Relations ==
It is in relation, in front, with the tendons of the flexor digitorum profundus and flexor pollicis longus.

Behind, it is closely adherent to the anterior border of the articular disk of the distal radioulnar articulation.

== Components ==
Some sources break down the components of the ligament as follows: radiolunate, radiocapitate, radiotriquetral, and radioscaphoid.

Other sources combine the radioscaphoid and radiocapitate into a "radioscaphocapitate".
