= Terry-Thomas sign =

Pattern seen in radiologic examinations

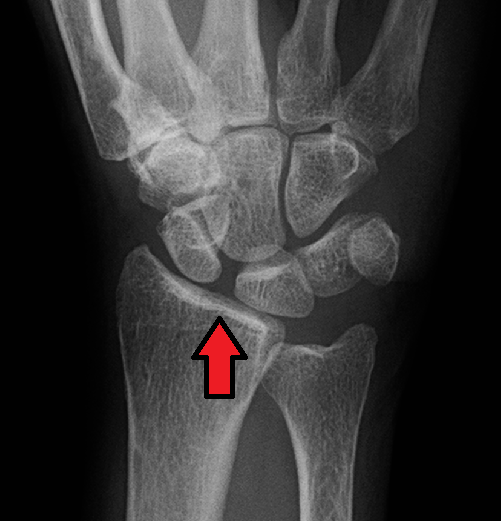
- Arrow pointing to the gap between scaphoid and lunate bones. Its name derives from Terry-Thomas, who had a similar looking gap between his two front teeth
- Differential diagnosis: scapholunate ligament dissociation

The Terry-Thomas sign is a scapholunate ligament dissociation on an anteroposterior radiological view of the wrist. Most commonly a result of a fall on the outstretched hand (FOOSH), the scapholunate ligament ruptures resulting in separation of the lunate and scaphoid bones. This burst causes the scaphoid bone to dorsally rotate. A gap of more than 3mm is pathognomonic for scapholunate dissociation.

The resulting separation between the scaphoid and lunate bones leaves a space on the x-ray that is similar to the gap comedian Terry-Thomas had between his front teeth. For newer radiology students who do not know who Terry-Thomas was, this finding might also be known as the David Letterman sign.
