= Radial styloid process =

Bone projection on the radius

- Human arm bones diagram

Details

Identifiers
- Latin: processus styloideus radii
- TA98: A02.4.05.015
- TA2: 1225
- FMA: 23524

The radial styloid process is a projection of bone on the lateral surface of the distal radius bone.

== Structure ==
The radial styloid process is found on the lateral surface of the distal radius bone. It extends obliquely downward into a strong, conical projection. The tendon of the brachioradialis attaches at its base. The radial collateral ligament of the wrist attaches at its apex. The lateral surface is marked by a flat groove for the tendons of the abductor pollicis longus and extensor pollicis brevis.

== Clinical significance ==
Breakage of the radius at the radial styloid is known as a Chauffeur's fracture; it is typically caused by compression of the scaphoid bone of the hand against the styloid.

De Quervain syndrome causes pain over the styloid process of the radius. This is due to the passage of the inflamed extensor pollicis brevis tendon and abductor pollicis longus tendon around it.

The styloid process of the radius is a useful landmark during arthroscopic resection of the scaphoid bone.

A prominent styloid process of the radius makes applying a wrist splint more difficult.
