= Ulnar deviation =

Hand deformity

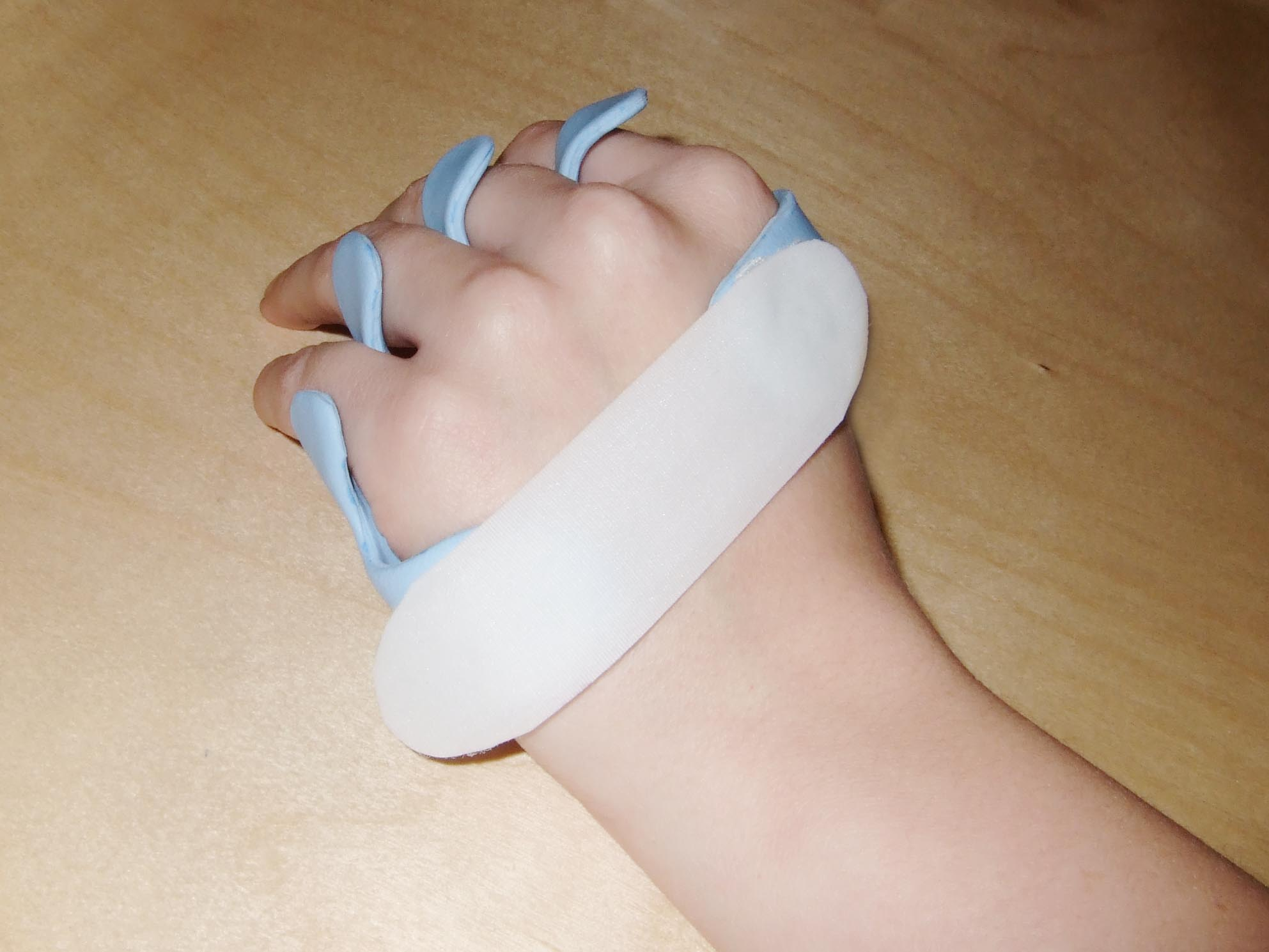
Hand affected by Ulnar deviation

Ulnar deviation, also known as ulnar drift, is a hand deformity in which the swelling of the metacarpophalangeal joints (the big knuckles at the base of the fingers) causes the fingers to become displaced, tending towards the little finger. Its name comes from the displacement toward the ulna (as opposed to radial deviation, in which fingers are displaced toward the radius). Ulnar deviation is likely to be a characteristic of rheumatoid arthritis, more than of osteoarthritis. Consideration should also be given to pigmented villonodular synovitis, in the setting of ulnar deviation and metacarpophalangeal synovitis.

Ulnar deviation is also a physiological movement of the wrist, where the hand including the fingers move towards the ulna. Ulnar deviation is a disorder in which flexion by ulnar nerve innervated muscles is intact while flexion on the median nerve side is not.
