= Scapholunate ligament injury =

Ligament of the wrist

- Other names: Scapholunate instability
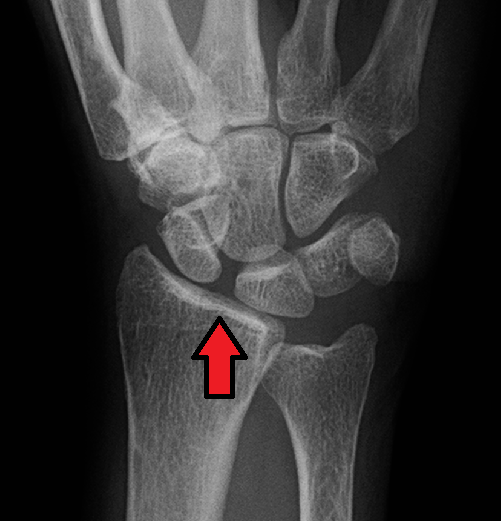
- Xray showing a scapholunate dissociation resulting from an injury
- Specialty: Plastic surgery

Scapholunate ligament injury is a disruption of the ligament connecting the scaphoid and lunate bones within the wrist. It may be partial or complete. If untreated, complications include a form of wrist osteoarthritis called scapholunate advanced collapse (SLAC).

== Complications ==
Eventually, untreated scapholunate instability generally causes a predictable pattern of wrist osteoarthritis called scapholunate advanced collapse (SLAC).

== Pathophysiology ==
The main type of such instability is dorsal intercalated segment instability (DISI) deformity, where the lunate angulates to the posterior side of the hand.

A dynamic scapholunate instability is where the scapholunate ligament is completely ruptured, but secondary scaphoid stabilizers are still preserved; these are the scaphotrapezial (ST), scaphocapitate (SC) and radioscaphocapitate (RSC) ligaments. In a static scapholunate instability, these other ligaments are ruptured as well.

=== Anatomy ===
Scapholunate ligament
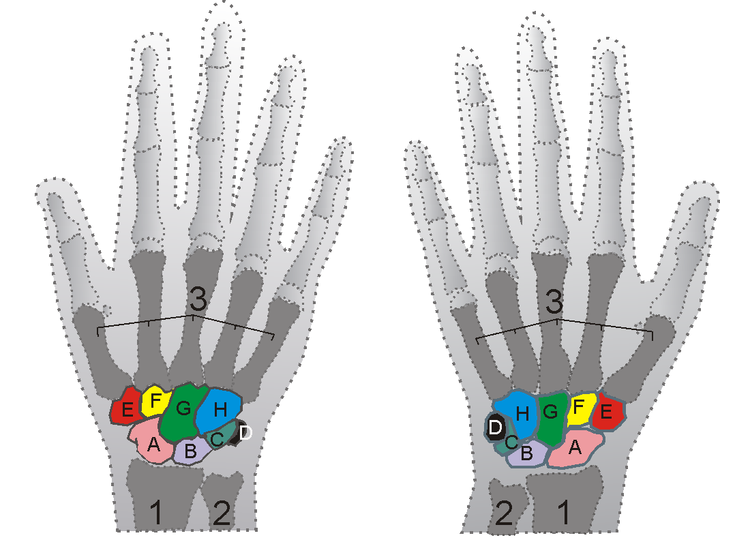
- The right hand, palm down (left) and palm up (right). A=Scaphoid, B=Lunate
- From: Scaphoid
- To: Lunate
- TA2: 1819

The scapholunate ligament is an intraarticular ligament binding the scaphoid and lunate bones of the wrist together. It is divided into three areas, dorsal, proximal and palmar, with the dorsal segment being the strongest part. It is the main stabilizer of the scaphoid. In contrast to the scapholunate ligament, the lunotriquetral ligament is more prominent on the palmar side.

== Diagnosis ==
X-ray images indicate scapholunate ligament instability when the scapholunate distance is more than 3 mm, which is called scapholunate dissociation. A static scapholunate instability is generally readily visible, but a dynamic scapholunate instability can only be seen radiographically in certain wrist positions or under certain loading conditions, such as when clenching the wrist, or loading the wrist in ulnar deviation.

In order to diagnose a SLAC wrist you need a posterior anterior (PA) view X-ray, a lateral view X-ray and a fist view X-ray. The fist X-ray is often made if there is no convincing Terry Thomas sign. A fist X-ray of a scapholunate ligament rupture will show a descending capitate bone. Making a fist will give pressure at the capitate, which will descend if there is a rupture in the scapholunate ligament.

The Watson's test may be used in diagnosis.

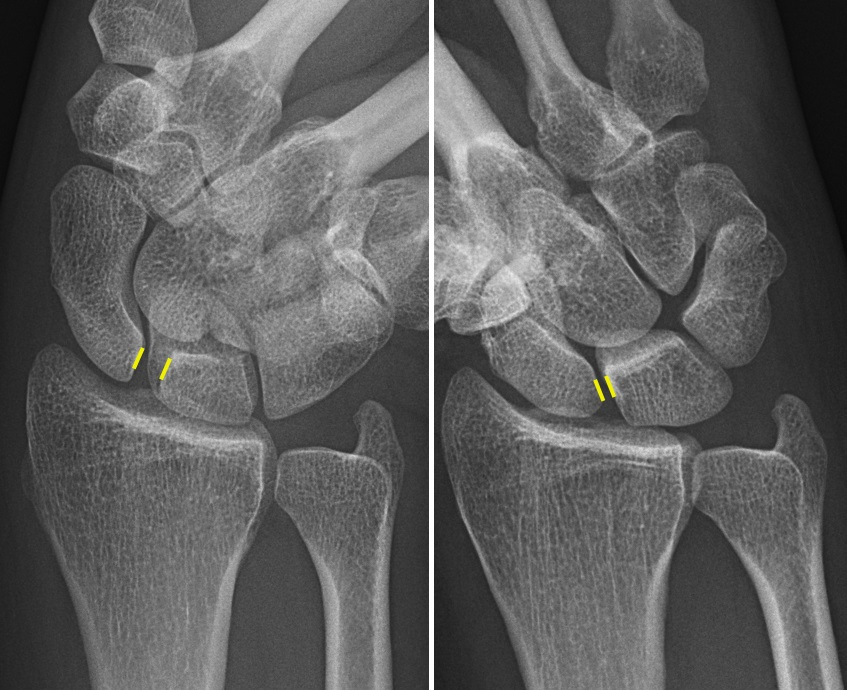
Dynamic instability: Increased scapholunate distance (between yellow lines) upon ulnar deviation of the wrist, but not otherwise.

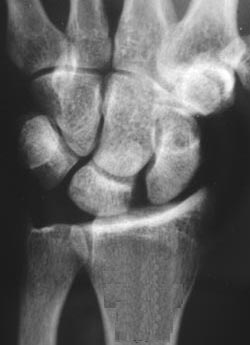
Dynamic scapholunate instability visible upon clenching the wrist

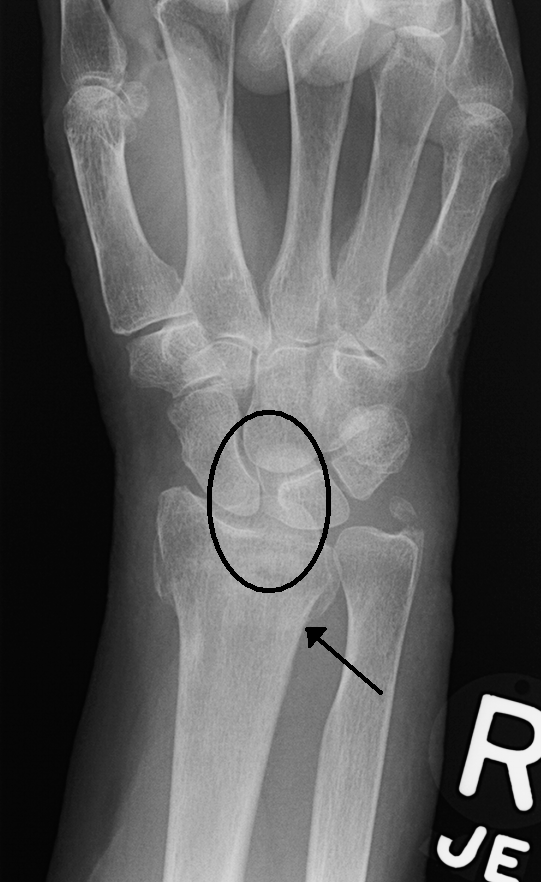
Scapholunate ligament disruption associated with a Colles' fracture

== Treatment ==
Treatments vary depending upon the degree of injury and can range from observation to direct ligament repair or reconstruction.
