= Wrist =

Part of the arm between the lower arm and the hand

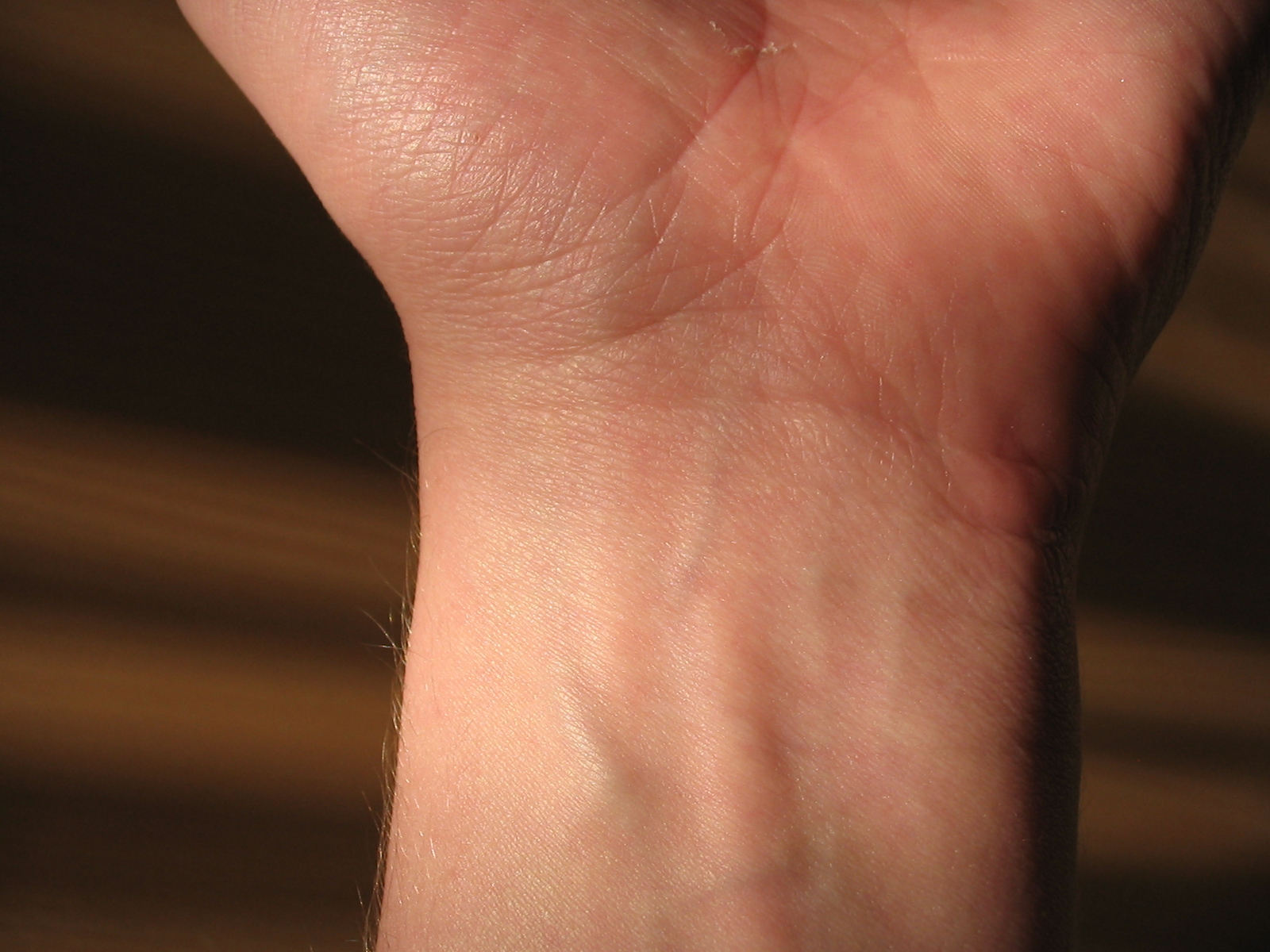
- A human showing the wrist in the centre

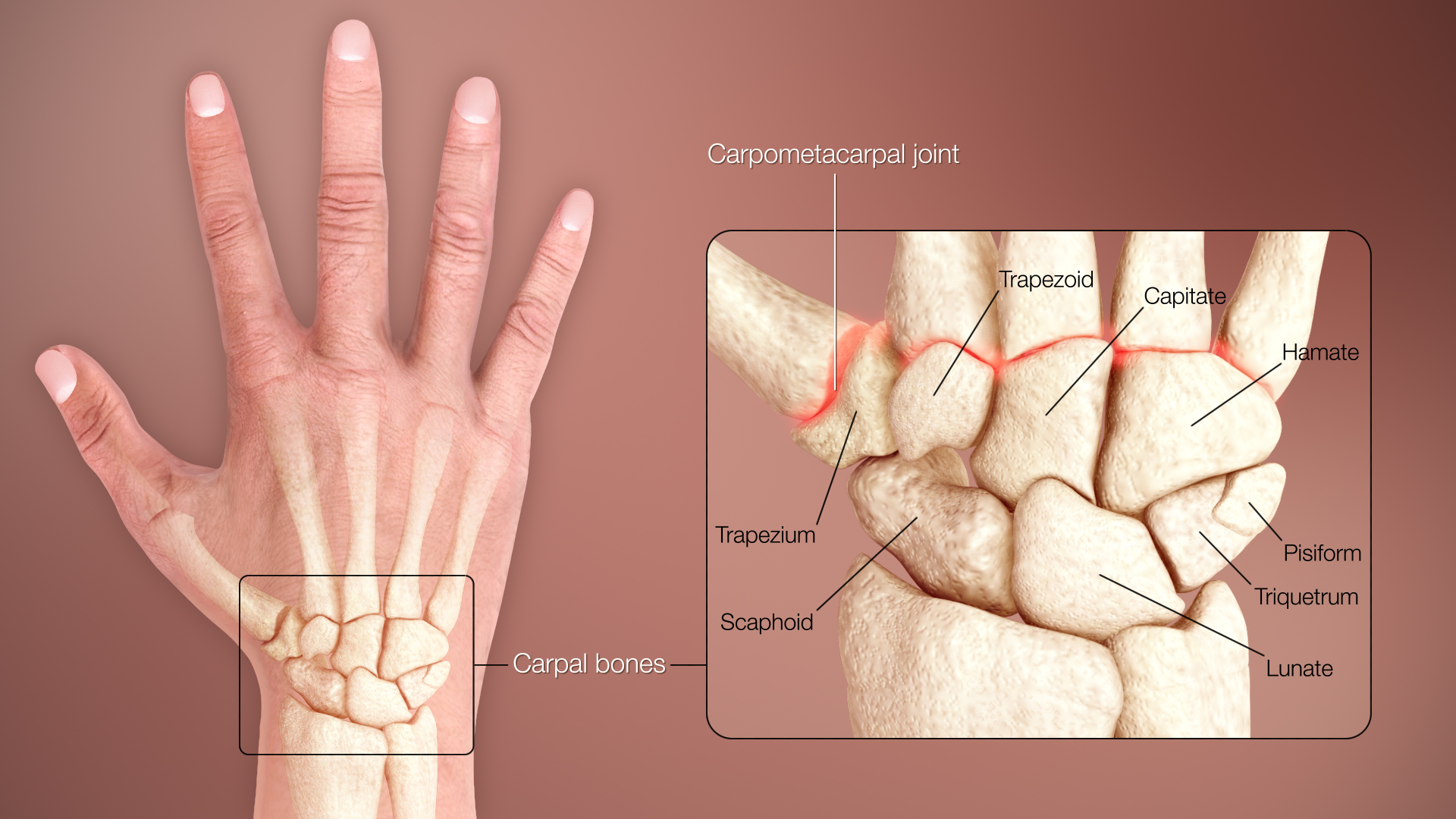
- The carpal bones, sometimes included in the definition of the wrist

Details

Identifiers
- Latin: articulatio radiocarpalis
- MeSH: D014953
- TA98: A01.1.00.026
- TA2: 147
- FMA: 24922

In human anatomy, the wrist is variously defined as (1) the carpus or carpal bones, the complex of eight bones forming the proximal skeletal segment of the hand; (2) the wrist joint or radiocarpal joint, the joint between the radius and the carpus and; (3) the anatomical region surrounding the carpus including the distal parts of the bones of the forearm and the proximal parts of the metacarpus or five metacarpal bones and the series of joints between these bones, thus referred to as wrist joints. This region also includes the carpal tunnel, the anatomical snuff box, bracelet lines, the flexor retinaculum, and the extensor retinaculum.

As a consequence of these various definitions, fractures to the carpal bones are referred to as carpal fractures, while fractures such as distal radius fracture are often considered fractures to the wrist.

== Structure ==
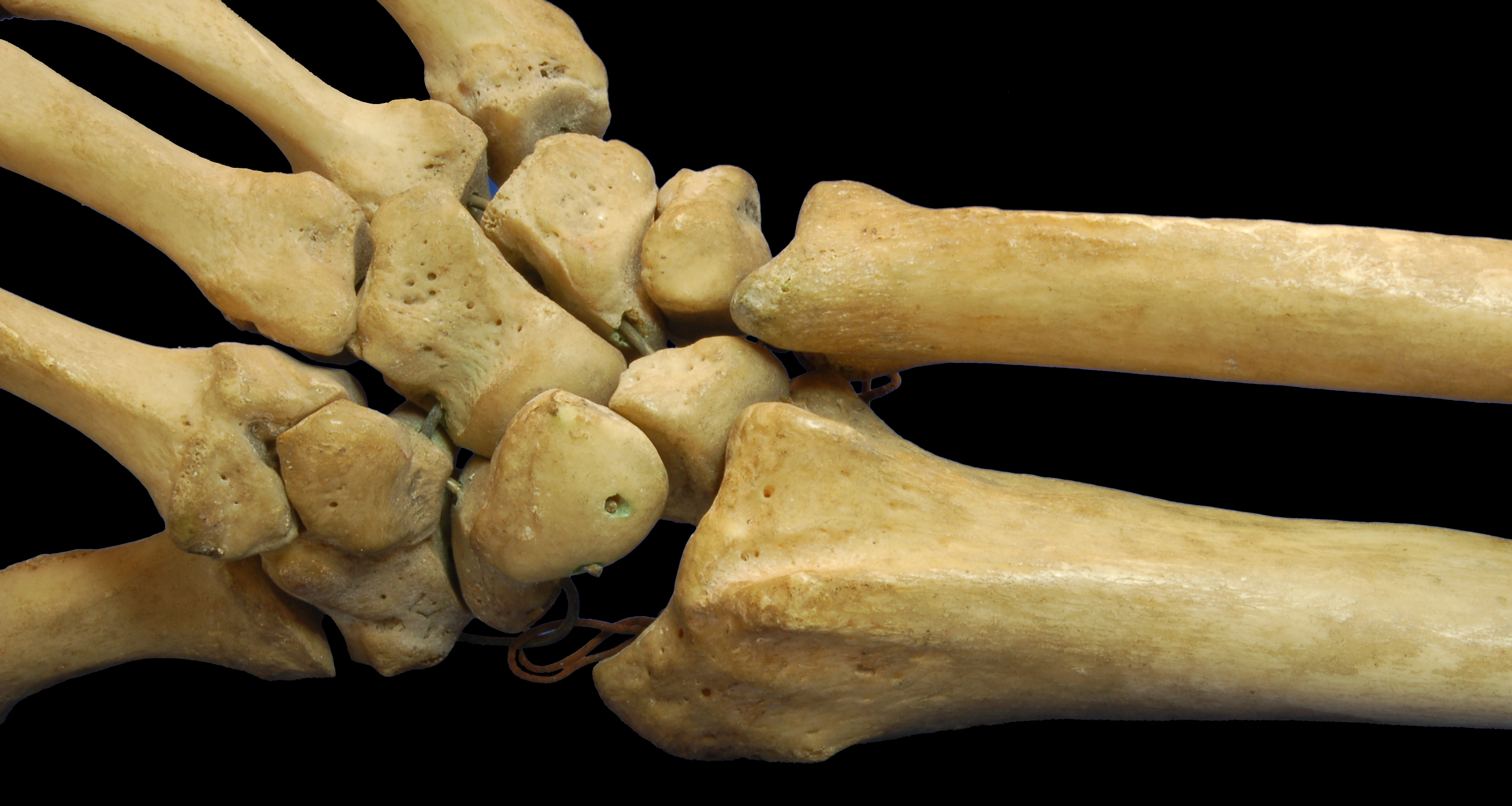
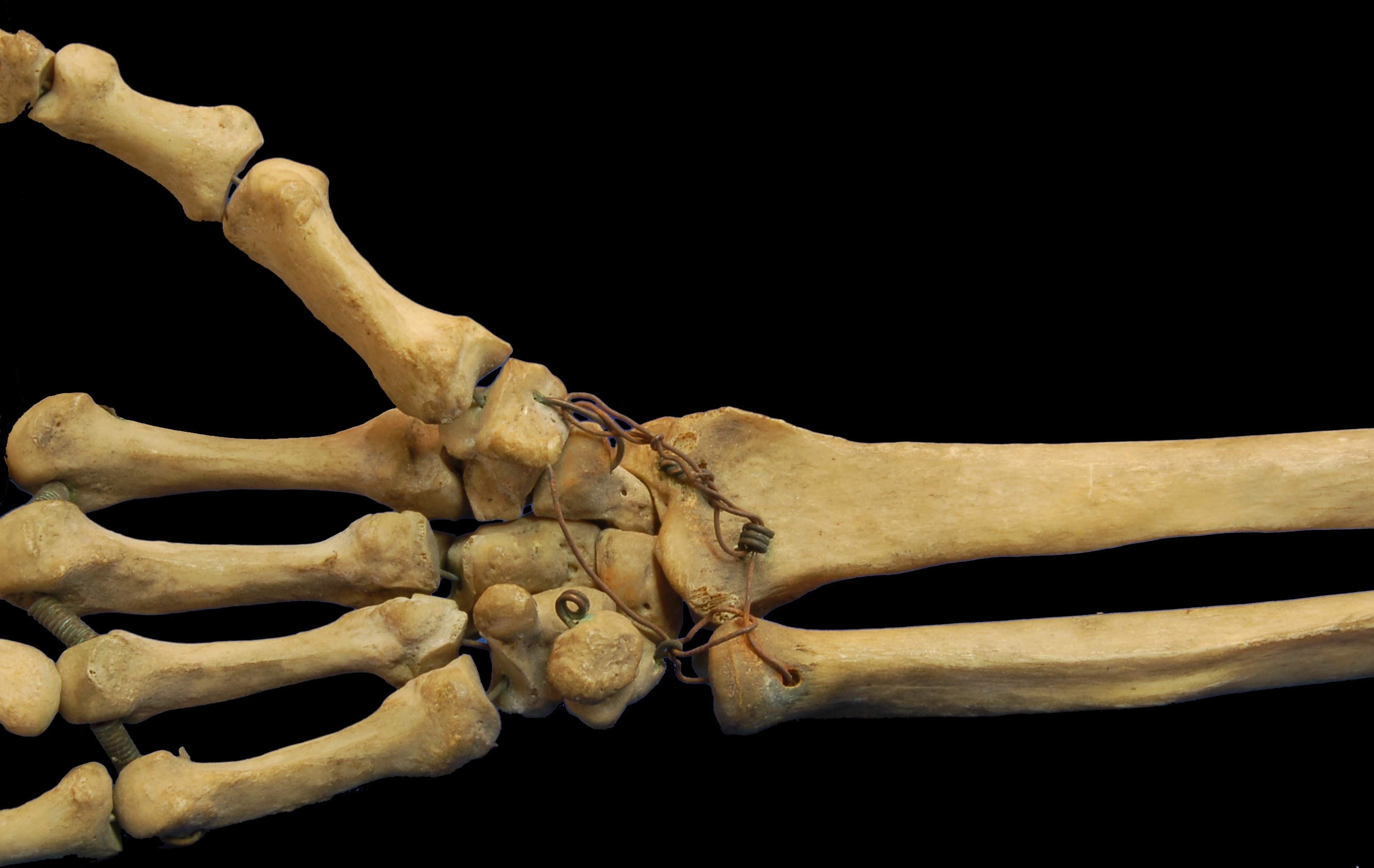
Posterior and anterior aspects of right human wrist
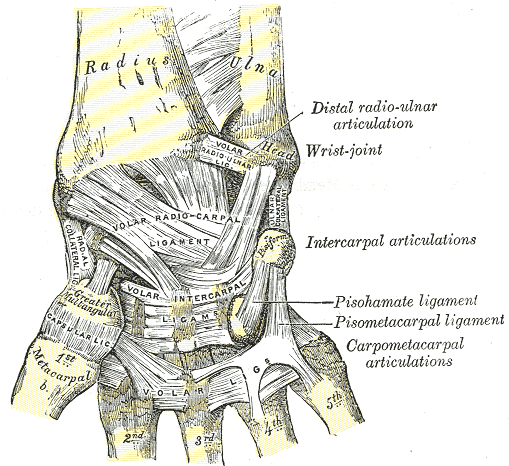
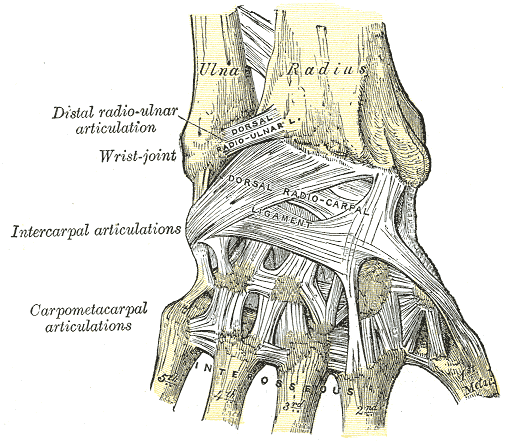
Ligaments of wrist. Posterior and anterior views

The distal radioulnar joint (DRUJ) is a pivot joint located between the distal ends of the radius and ulna, which make up the forearm. Formed by the head of the ulna (the bony knob on the back of the wrist) and the ulnar notch of the radius, the DRUJ is separated from the radiocarpal (wrist) joint by an articular disk lying between the radius and the styloid process of the ulna. The capsule of the joint is lax and extends from the inferior sacciform recess to the ulnar shaft. The DRUJ works with the proximal radioulnar joint (at the elbow) for pronation and supination.

The radiocarpal (wrist) joint is an ellipsoid joint formed by the radius and the articular disc proximally and the proximal row of carpal bones distally. The carpal bones on the ulnar side only make intermittent contact with the proximal side — the triquetrum only makes contact during ulnar abduction. The capsule, lax and un-branched, is thin on the dorsal side and can contain synovial folds. The capsule is continuous with the midcarpal joint and strengthened by numerous ligaments, including the palmar and dorsal radiocarpal ligaments, and the ulnar and radial collateral ligaments.

The parts forming the radiocarpal joint are the lower end of the radius and under surface of the articular disk above; and the scaphoid, lunate, and triquetral bones below. The articular surface of the radius and the undersurface of the articular disk form together with a transversely elliptical concave surface, the receiving cavity. The superior articular surfaces of the scaphoid, lunate, and triquetrum form a smooth convex surface, the condyle, which is received into the concavity.

Carpal bones of the hand:

- Proximal: A=Scaphoid, B=Lunate, C=Triquetrum, D=Pisiform
- Distal: E=Trapezium, F=Trapezoid, G=Capitate, H=Hamate

In the hand proper a total of 13 bones form part of the wrist: eight carpal bones—scaphoid, lunate, triquetral, pisiform, trapezium, trapezoid, capitate, and hamate— and five metacarpal bones—the first, second, third, fourth, and fifth metacarpal bones.

The midcarpal joint is the S-shaped joint space separating the proximal and distal rows of carpal bones. The intercarpal joints, between the bones of each row, are strengthened by the radiate carpal and pisohamate ligaments and the palmar, interosseous, and dorsal intercarpal ligaments. Some degree of mobility is possible between the bones of the proximal row while the bones of the distal row are connected to each other and to the metacarpal bones —at the carpometacarpal joints— by strong ligaments —the pisometacarpal and palmar and dorsal carpometacarpal ligament— that makes a functional entity of these bones. Additionally, the joints between the bases of the metacarpal bones —the intermetacarpal articulations— are strengthened by dorsal, interosseous, and palmar intermetacarpal ligaments.

The earliest carpal bones to ossify are capitate bone and hamate bone in the first six months of an infant life.

=== Articulations ===
The radiocarpal, intercarpal, midcarpal, carpometacarpal, and intermetacarpal joints often intercommunicate through a common synovial cavity.

==== Articular surfaces ====
It has two articular surfaces named, proximal and distal articular surfaces respectively. The proximal articular surface is made up of the lower end of the radius and a triangular articular disc of the inferior radio-ulnar joint. On the other hand, the distal articular surface is made up of proximal surfaces of the scaphoid, triquetral and lunate bones.

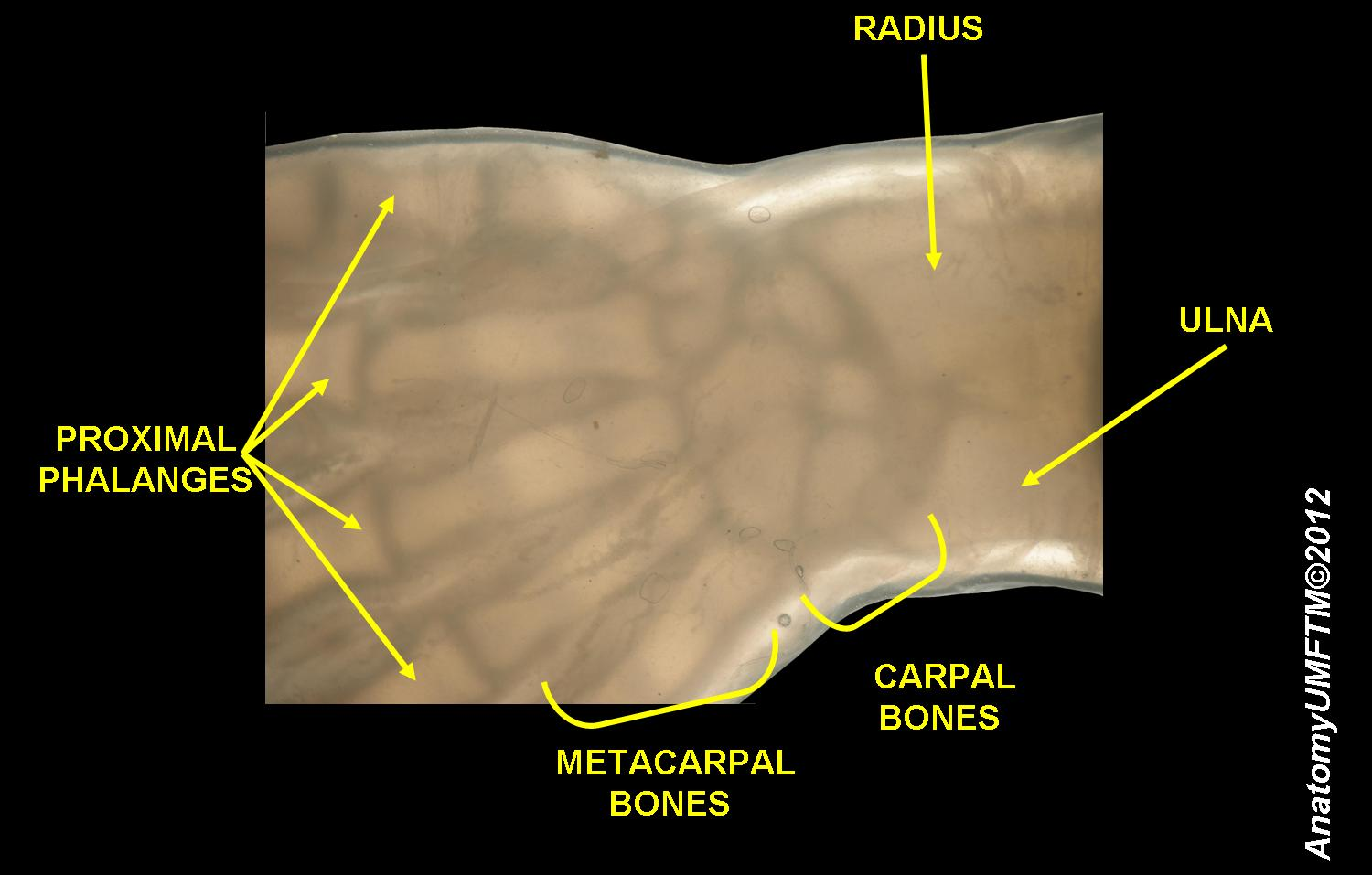
Micro-radiography of 8-weeks human embryo hand

== Function ==
=== Movement ===
The extrinsic hand muscles are located in the forearm where their bellies form the proximal fleshy roundness. When contracted, most of the tendons of these muscles are prevented from standing up like taut bowstrings around the wrist by passing under the flexor retinaculum on the palmar side and the extensor retinaculum on the dorsal side. On the palmar side the carpal bones form the carpal tunnel, through which some of the flexor tendons pass in tendon sheaths that enable them to slide back and forth through the narrow passageway (see carpal tunnel syndrome).

Starting from the mid-position of the hand, the movements permitted in the wrist proper are (muscles in order of importance):

Magnetic resonance imaging (MRI) of radial abduction (rightwards in image) and ulnar adduction (leftwards in image)

- Marginal movements: radial deviation (abduction, movement towards the thumb) and ulnar deviation (adduction, movement towards the little finger). These movements take place about a dorsopalmar axis (back to front) at the radiocarpal and midcarpal joints passing through the capitate bone.
  - Radial abduction (up to 20°): extensor carpi radialis longus, abductor pollicis longus, extensor pollicis longus, flexor carpi radialis, flexor pollicis longus
  - Ulnar adduction (up to 30°): extensor carpi ulnaris, flexor carpi ulnaris, extensor digitorum, extensor digiti minimi
- Movements in the plane of the hand: flexion (palmar flexion, tilting towards the palm) and extension (dorsiflexion, tilting towards the back of the hand). These movements take place through a transverse axis passing through the capitate bone. Palmar flexion is the most powerful of these movements because the flexors, especially the finger flexors, are considerably stronger than the extensors.

Magnetic resonance imaging (MRI) of wrist extension and return to neutral position

- Extension (up to 60°): extensor digitorum, extensor carpi radialis longus, extensor carpi radialis brevis, extensor indicis, extensor pollicis longus, extensor digiti minimi, extensor carpi ulnaris
- Palmar flexion (up to 70°): flexor digitorum superficialis, flexor digitorum profundus, flexor carpi ulnaris, flexor pollicis longus, flexor carpi radialis, abductor pollicis longus
- Intermediate or combined movements

However, movements at the wrist can not be properly described without including movements in the distal radioulnar joint in which the rotary actions of supination and pronation occur and this joint is therefore normally regarded as part of the wrist.

== Clinical significance ==
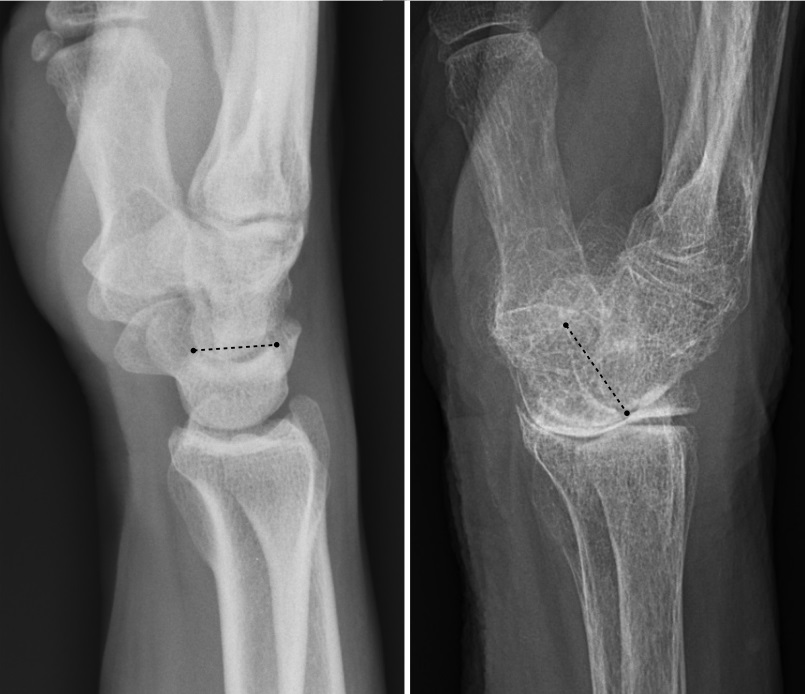
Projectional radiograph of a normal wrist (left image) and one with a dorsal tilt due to wrist osteoarthritis (as well as osteoporosis). The angle of the distal surface of the lunate bone is annotated. A dorsal tilt of 10 to 15 degrees is considered normal.

Wrist pain has a number of causes, including carpal tunnel syndrome, ganglion cyst, tendinitis, and osteoarthritis. Tests such as Phalen's test involve palmarflexion at the wrist.

The hand may deviate at the wrist in some conditions, such as rheumatoid arthritis.

Ossification of the bones around the wrist is one indicator used in taking a bone age.

A wrist fracture typically refers to a distal radius fracture. It is more common in non-Hispanic women and is associated with factors such as alcohol consumption, smoking, high serum phosphate levels, osteoporosis, and obesity.

== History ==
=== Etymology ===
The English word "wrist" is etymologically derived from the Proto-Germanic word wristiz from which are derived modern German Rist ("instep", "wrist") and modern Swedish vrist ("instep", "ankle"). The base writh- and its variants are associated with Old English words "wreath", "wrest", and "writhe". The wr- sound of this base seems originally to have been symbolic of the action of twisting.

== See also ==
- Brunelli procedure, related to instability in the wrist, caused by a torn scapholunate ligament.
- Knuckle-walking, a kind of quadrupedal locomotion involving wrist bone specialization
- Wristlocks use movement extremes of the wrist for martial applications.
- Glossary of bowling § Wrist, a measure of wrist position in bowling ball deliveries

== Additional images ==
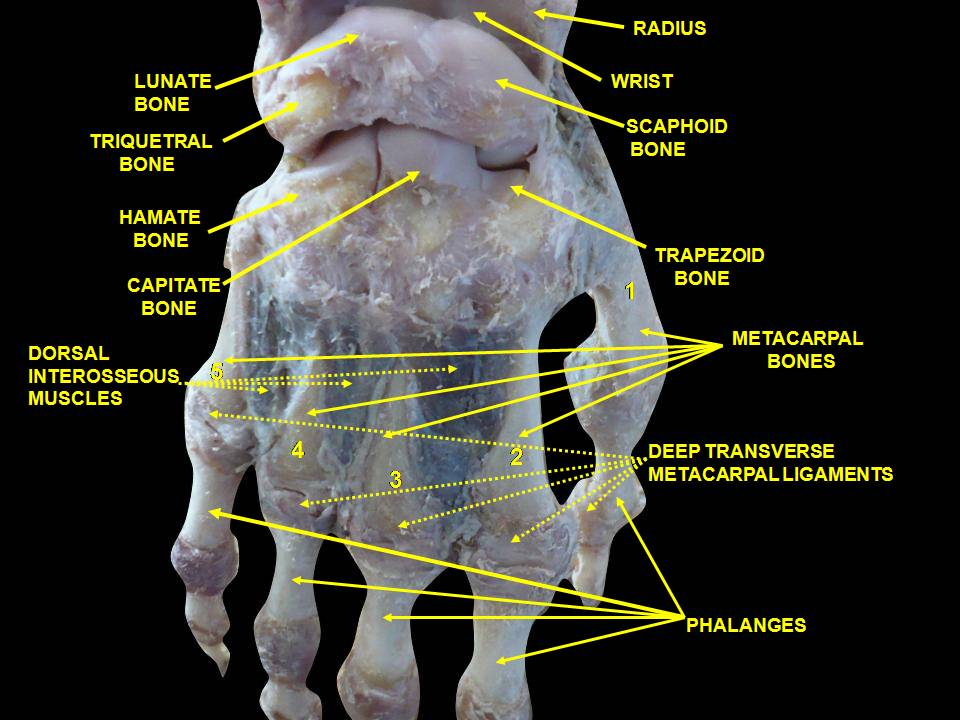
Wrist joint. Deep dissection. Posterior view.

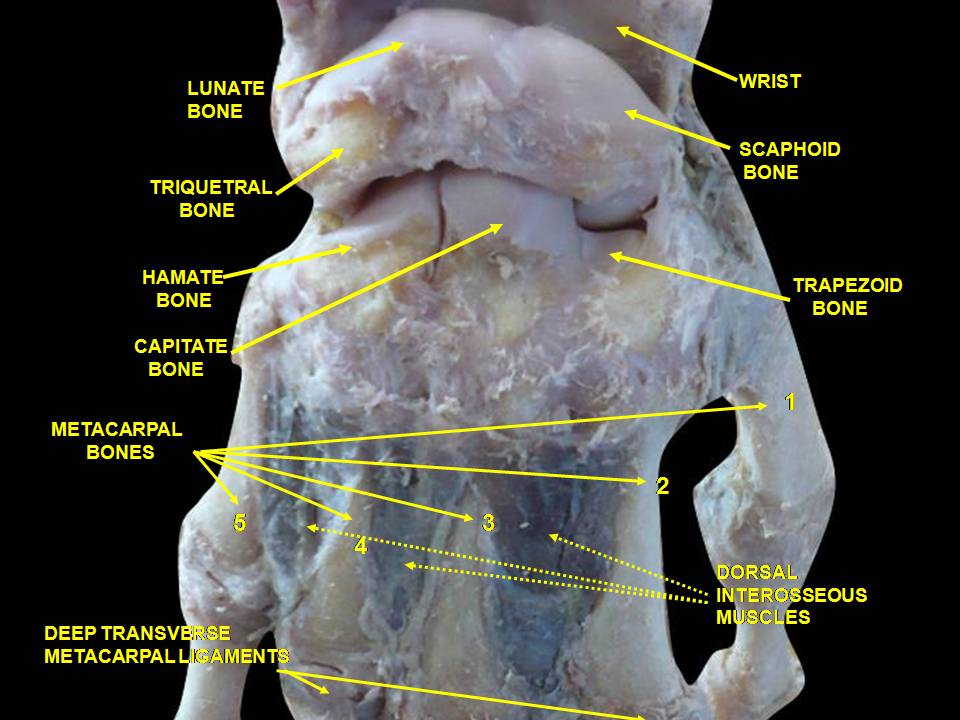
Wrist joint. Deep dissection. Posterior view.

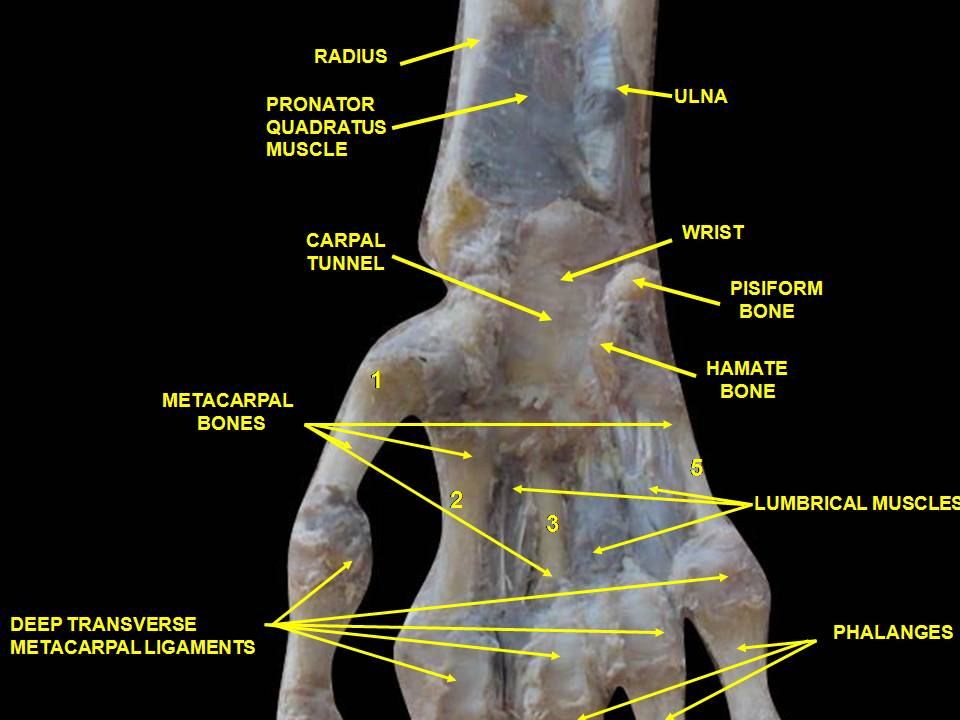
Wrist joint. Deep dissection. Anterior, palmar, view.

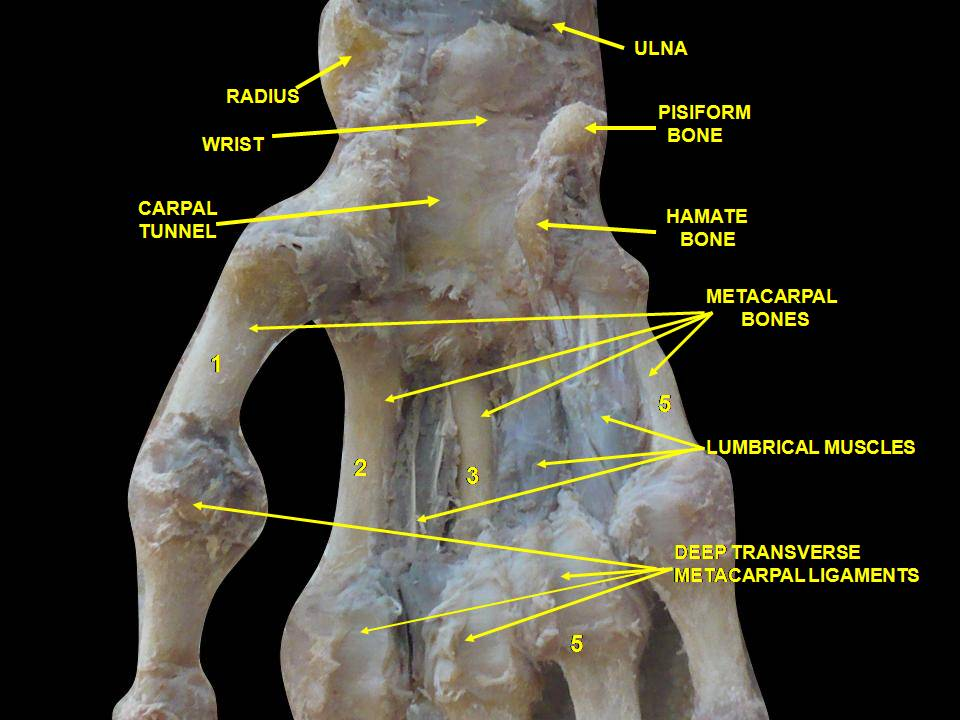
Wrist joint. Deep dissection. Anterior, palmar, view.

== Sources ==
- Behnke RS (2006). Kinetic anatomy. Human Kinetics. ISBN 0-7360-5909-1.
- Platzer W (2004). Color Atlas of Human Anatomy, Vol. 1: Locomotor System (5th ed.). Thieme. ISBN 3-13-533305-1.
