= Triangular fibrocartilage =

Anatomical feature in the wrist

Triangular fibrocartilage complex
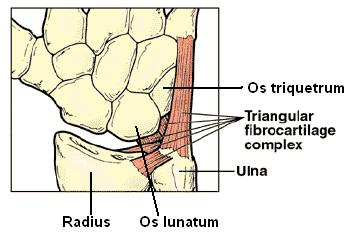
- Anatomy of the triangular fibrocartilage complex (TFCC)

Details

Identifiers
- Latin: discus articularis articulationis radioulnaris distalis
- MeSH: D051478

The triangular fibrocartilage complex (TFCC) is formed by the triangular fibrocartilage discus (TFC), the radioulnar ligaments (RULs) and the ulnocarpal ligaments (UCLs).

== Structure ==
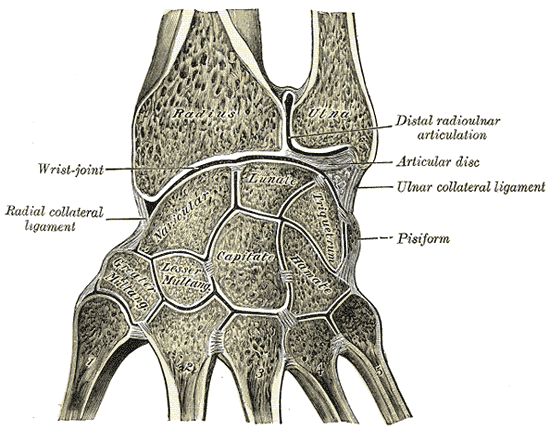
Vertical section through the articulations at the wrist, showing the synovial cavities. (Articular disc labeled at center right.)

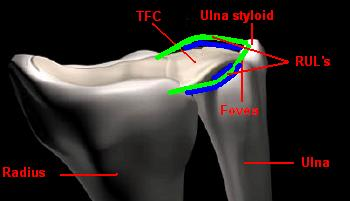
Anatomy of the triangular fibrocartilage complex (TFCC)

=== Triangular fibrocartilage disc ===
The triangular fibrocartilage disc (TFC) is an articular discus that lies on the pole of the distal ulna. It has a triangular shape and a biconcave body; the periphery is thicker than its center. The central portion of the TFC is thin and consists of chondroid fibrocartilage; this type of tissue is often seen in structures that can bear compressive loads. This central area is often so thin that it is translucent and in some cases it is even absent. The peripheral portion of the TFC is well vascularized, while the central portion has no blood supply.

This discus is attached by thick tissue to the base of the ulnar styloid and by thinner tissue to the edge of the radius just proximal to the radiocarpal articular surface.

=== Radioulnar ligaments ===
The radioulnar ligaments (RULs) are the principal stabilizers of the distal radioulnar joint (DRUJ). There are two RULs: the palmar and dorsal radioulnar ligaments.

These ligaments arise from the distal radius medial border and insert on the ulna at two separate and distinct sites: the ulna styloid and the fovea (a groove that separates the ulnar styloid from the ulnar head). Each ligament consists of a superficial component and a deep component. The superficial components insert directly onto the ulna styloid. The deep components insert more anterior, into the fovea adjacent to the articular surface of the dome of the distal ulna.

The ligaments are composed of longitudinally oriented lamellar collagen to resist tensile loads and have a rich vascular supply to allow healing.

=== Ulnocarpal ligaments ===
The ulnocarpal ligaments (UCLs) consist of the ulnolunate and the ulnotriquetral ligaments. They originate from the ulnar styloid and insert into the carpal bones of the wrist: the ulnolunate ligament inserts into the lunate bone and the ulnotriquetral ligament into the triquetrum bone. These ligaments prevent dorsal migration of the distal ulna. They are more taut during supination, because in supination ulnar styloid moves away from the carpal bones volar side.

== Function ==
The primary functions of the TFCC:

- To cover the ulna head by extending the articular surface of the distal radius.
- Load transmission across the ulnocarpal joint and partially load absorbing
- Allows forearm rotation by giving a strong but flexible connection between the distal radius and ulna. It also supports the ulnar portion of the carpus.

=== Load transmission ===
The TFCC is important in load transmission across the ulnar aspect of the wrist. The TFC transmits and absorbs compressive forces.

The ulnar variance influences the amount of load that is transmitted through the distal ulna. The load transmission is directly proportional to this ulnar variance. In neutral ulnar variance, approximately 20 percent of the load is transmitted. With negative ulnar variance, the load across the TFC is decreased. This occurs during supination, because the radius moves distally on the ulna and creates a negative ulnar variance. With positive ulnar variance it is reversed. The load that is transmitted across the TFC is then increased. This positive ulnar variance occurs during pronation.

=== Rotation ===
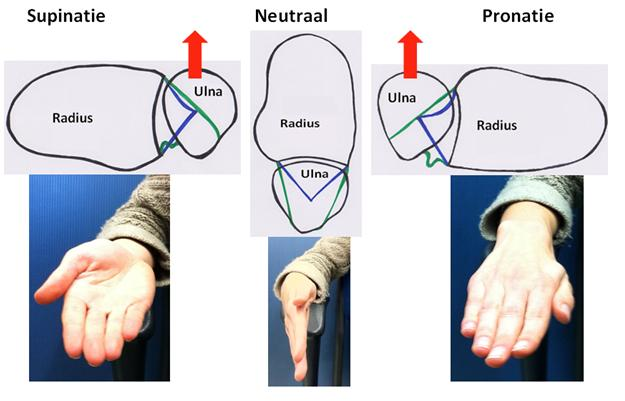
Rul's prosupination

The TFCC is a major stabilizer of the DRUJ. To control the forearm rotation the DRUJ acts in concert with the proximal radioulnar joint. The connection between the distal radius and the distal ulna, maintain the congruency of the DRUJ. This attachment is mainly created by the RULs of the TFCC. These ligaments support the joint through its arc of rotation.

The role of the TFCC in supination and in pronation is a matter of dispute. Some authors (Schuind et al.) concluded that the dorsal fibers of the TFCC tighten in pronation, and the palmar fibers in supination. These conclusions are opposite of those published by Af Ekenstam and Hagert.

Both parties are in fact right, as the RULs consists of two ligaments each made of another two components: the superficial and the deep ligaments. During supination, the superficial palmar and the deep dorsal ligaments are tightened, preventing palmar translation of the ulna. In pronation, this is reversed: the superficial dorsal and the deep palmar ligaments are tightened and prevent dorsal translation of the ulna.

== Clinical significance ==
The TFCC has a substantial risk for injury and degeneration because of its anatomic complexity and multiple functions.

Application of an extension-pronation force to an axial-load wrist, such as in a fall on an outstretched hand, causes most of the traumatic injuries of the TFCC.

Dorsal rotation injury, such as when a drill binds and rotates the wrist instead of the bit, can also cause traumatic injuries.

Injury may also occur from a distraction force applied to the volar forearm or wrist. Finally, tears of the TFCC are frequently found by patients with distal radius fractures.

Perforations and defects in the TFCC are not all traumatic. There is an age related correlation with lesions in the TFCC, but many of these defects are asymptomatic. These lesions common occur by patients with positive ulnar variance.

Chronic and excessive loading through the ulnocarpal joint, causes degenerative TFCC tears. These tears are a component of ulnar impaction syndrome.

Even though natural degeneration of the ulnocarpal joint is very common, it is important to recognize. In cadavaric examinations, 30% to 70% of the cases had TFCC perforations and chondromalacia of the ulnar head, lunate, and triquetrum. Cases with ulnar-negative variance had fewer degenerative changes.

=== Palmer classification of TFCC lesions ===
The Palmer classification is the most recognized scheme; it divides TFCC lesions into these two categories: traumatic and degenerative. This classification provides an anatomic description of tears, it does not guide treatment or indicate prognosis.

Class 1 – Traumatic
Class 1A. Central perforation
Class 1B. Ulnar avulsion (with or without styloid fracture)
Class 1C. Distal avulsion (from carpus)
Class 1D. Radial avulsion (with or without sigmoid notch fracture)

Class 2 – Degenerative (ulnar impaction syndrome)
Class 2A. TFCC wear
Class 2B. TFCC wear with lunate and/or ulnar head chondromalacia
Class 2C. TFCC perforation with lunate and/or ulnar head chondromalacia
Class 2D. TFCC perforation with lunate and/or ulnar head chondromalacia, and with lunotriquetral ligament perforation
Class 2E. TFCC perforation with lunate and/or ulnar head chondromalacia, with lunotriquetral ligament perforation, and with ulnocarpal arthritis

=== Symptoms ===
Patients with a TFCC injury usually experience pain or discomfort located at the ulnar side of the wrist, often just above the ulnar styloid. However, there are also some patients who report diffuse pain throughout the entire wrist.

Rest can reduce pain and activity can make it worse, especially with rotating movements (supination and pronation) of the wrist or movements of the hand sideways in ulnar direction.

Other symptoms patients with a TFCC injury frequently mention are: swelling, loss of grip strength, instability, and grinding or clicking sounds (crepitus) that can occur during activity of the wrist.

=== Diagnosis ===
Anamnesis

Injuries to the TFCC may be preceded by a fall on a pronated outstretched arm; a rotational injury to the forearm; an axial load trauma to the wrist; or a distraction injury of the wrist in ulnar direction. However, not all patients can recall that a preceding trauma occurred.

Physical examination

- Palpation: The best place to palpate the TFCC is between the extensor carpi ulnaris (ECU) and the flexor carpi ulnaris (FCU), distal to the ulnar styloid and proximal to the pisiform bone. Tenderness in this area may be consistent with a TFCC lesion.
- Piano key sign: Dorsal DRUJ instability can cause a protruding ulna head, which can be pressed down. When you release the pressure, it will spring back in position again, just like a piano key.
- DRUJ stress test: With this provocation maneuver, the wrist is held in pronated or supinated position, while the physician attempts to manipulate the distal ulna in dorsal and volar direction. Painful laxity indicates DRUJ instability and suggests RUL pathology.
- Ulnar grind test: The forearm is fixated and the wrist is held in dorsiflexion. The physician then applies axial load, while he rotates and deviates the wrist in ulnar direction. Pain and crepitations during this provocation maneuver suggest DRUJ instability or arthritis.

==== Imaging ====
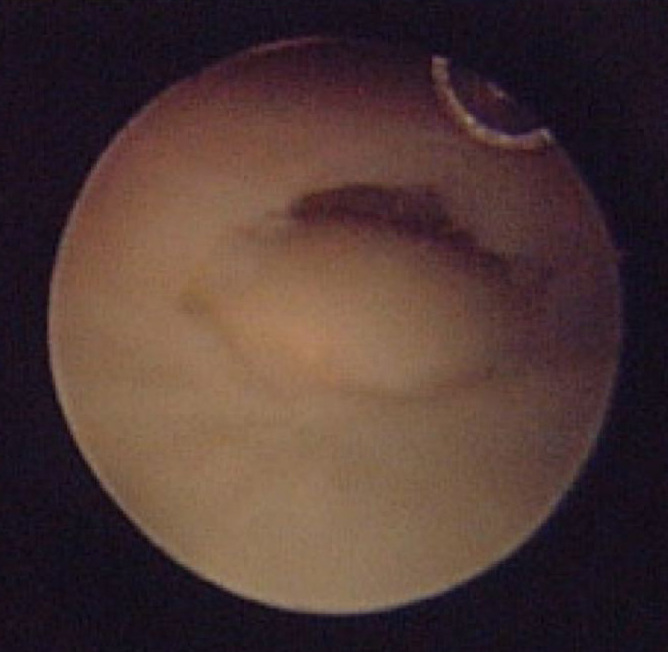
Arthroscopic image of a central triangular fibrocartilage complex (TFCC) tear

- X-ray: X-rays of the wrist are made in two directions: posterior-anterior (PA) and lateral. Radiographs are useful to diagnose or rule out possible bone fractures, a positive ulnar variance or osteoarthritis. The TFCC is not visible on an X-ray, regardless of its condition.
- MRI: is, together with the findings of a careful physical examination, a helpful diagnostic tool to assess the condition of the TFCC. Nevertheless, the incidence of false-positive and false-negative MRI results is high.
- Arthrography: a dye is injected into the wrist joint. If there is a TFCC lesion the dye will leak from one joint compartment to another.
- Wrist arthroscopy: is an invasive diagnostic tool, but it remains to this day the most accurate way to identify TFCC lesions.

Note: Imaging techniques can only be relevant together with the clinical findings of a carefully performed physical examination.

Other than a TFCC injury, there are many possible causes for ulnar-sided wrist pain.

=== Differential diagnosis of TFCC injuries ===
- Tendinopathy of the ECU
- Ulnar styloid fracture
- Distal radius fracture
- DRUJ arthritis
- Pisiform bone fractures
- Hamate bone fractures
- Carpal instability
- Midcarpal instability
- Hypothenar hammer syndrome (ulnar artery thrombosis)

=== Treatment ===
The initial treatment for both traumatic and degenerative TFCC lesions, with a stable DRUJ, is conservative (nonsurgical) therapy. Patients may be advised to wear a temporary splint or cast to immobilize the wrist and forearm for four to six weeks. The immobilization allows scar tissue to develop which can help heal the TFCC. In addition, oral NSAIDs and corticosteroid joint injections can be prescribed for pain relief. Physiotherapy and occupational therapy can help patients recover after immobilization or surgery. Wrist support straps used in sports can also be used in mild cases to compress and minimize movement of the area.

Indications for acute TFCC surgery are: a clearly unstable DRUJ, or the existence of additional unstable or displaced fractures. TFCC surgery is also indicated when conservative treatment proves insufficient in about 8–12 weeks.

Fractures of the radius bone are often associated by TFCC damage. If the fracture is treated surgically it is recommended to evaluate and if necessary repair the TFCC as well. Closed fractures (where the skin is still intact) of the radius bone are treated non-surgically with cast; the immobilization can also help heal the TFCC.

==== Surgical ====
Arthroscopic debridement of TFC discus tissue

The central part of the TFC has no blood supply and therefore has no healing capacity. When a tear occurs in this area of the TFC, it typically creates an unstable flap of tissue that is likely to catch on other joint surfaces. Removing the damaged tissue (debridement) is then indicated. Arthroscopic debridement as a treatment for degenerative TFC tears associated with positive ulnar variance, unfortunately, show poor results.

Arthroscopic repair of TFCC ligaments

Suturing TFCC ligaments can sometimes be performed arthroscopically. But only if there is no serious damage to the ligaments or other surrounding structures. Even after a short period of time torn ligaments tend to retract and therefore lose length. Retracted ligament ends are impossible to suture together again and a reconstruction may be necessary.

Open surgical repair of the TFCC

Open surgery is usually required for degenerative or more complex TFCC injuries, or if additional damage to the wrist or forearm caused instability or displacement. It is a more invasive surgical technique compared to arthroscopic treatment, but the surgeon has better visibility and access to the TFCC.

Options for open surgery
- Suturing of the RULs. This is, just like arthroscopic suturing of these ligaments, only possible when the damage is not too serious and if both ends of the ruptured ligament are not yet retracted.
- Anatomic reconstruction of the RULs using a tendon graft (e.g., the palmaris longus). The tendon graft is tunneled through drilled holes in the ulnar and radius bones. This procedure is indicated for DRUJ instability caused by an irreparable TFCC.
- Capsular or extensor retinaculum plication. This surgical technique aims to improve DRUJ stability by shortening the joint capsule or the extensor retinaculum. It is mostly used for minor DRUJ instability and is less invasive compared to a complete RUL reconstruction.
- Shortening of the ulnar bone. Patients with a positive ulnar variance are more susceptible to TFCC damage. Shortening the ulnar bone may help relieve the excess pressure to the TFCC and prevent further degeneration.
