= Wrist arthroscopy =

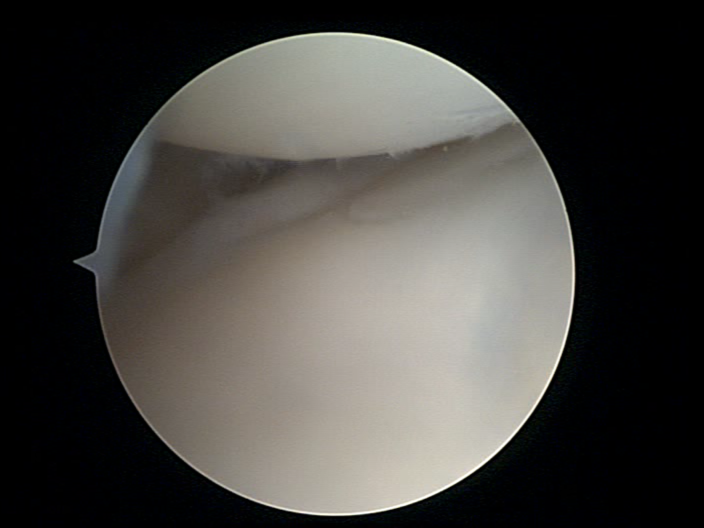
- Wrist arthroscopy

Wrist arthroscopy can be used to look inside the joint of the wrist. It is a minimally invasive technique which can be utilized for diagnostic purposes as well as for therapeutic interventions. Wrist arthroscopy has been used for diagnostic purposes since it was first introduced in 1979. However, it only became accepted as diagnostic tool around the mid-1980s. At that time, arthroscopy of the wrist was an innovative technique to determine whether a problem could be found in the wrist. A few years later, wrist arthroscopy could also be used as a therapeutic tool.

== Medical uses ==
There are several therapeutic wrist arthroscopy indications. This article will focus on the TFCC-lesion, SL-lesion, dorsal ganglion resection and distal radius fracture.

=== TFCC lesion ===
The triangular fibrocartilage complex (TFCC) is a fibrous structure covering both the radiocarpal and distal radioulnar joint. Tears in this ligament occur commonly after a person falls or secondary to a wrist fracture. Abnormalities in the TFCC are classified with the Palmer Classification, which divides the tears in a traumatic or degenerative stage. Both stages of TFCC tears are treatable with an arthroscopic intervention, although the degenerative stage is operated on with the arthroscopic wafer procedure. In this procedure, the surgeon debrides the TFCC and a limited part of the ulnar head. If the patient has a Class 1 TFCC tear, a different arthroscopic technique is used. Damaged tissue will be debrided until fresh edges are available for arthroscopic repair. Good to excellent results have been reported on TFCC Class 1B repair for 85-90% of the patients. 90% of the results for the arthroscopic wafer procedure were good to excellent.

=== Scapholunate and lunotriquetral instability ===
The initial treatment of patients with a suspected tear of the scapholunate and lunotriquetral interosseous ligament is a splint of the wrist. If the pain and instability persists, one could undergo an open surgery to reconstruct the scapholunate ligament. The lunotriquetral shear test may also be used. Arthroscopy is still in an experimental stage, but research suggest that in the near future it will be a reasonable alternative for open surgery due to faster recovery time. For a tear in the lunotriquetral ligament, arthroscopic debridement is the prime treatment with a loss or reduction of symptoms of 78-100%.

=== Dorsal ganglion resection ===
28 to 58% of the dorsal ganglia resolve spontaneously, but some patients choose to undergo cosmetic intervention for resection of the ganglion when non-operative treatment fails. Some examples of this non-operative treatment are immobilization through a splint or aspiration of the ganglion with or without injection of a steroid. In some cases the ganglia are associated with serious loss of wrist function or weakness in the affected finger, which makes a surgical intervention highly indicated.

Resection of dorsal ganglion are still widely treated with open surgery. However, recent studies show that treatment with an arthroscopic intervention is a reasonable alternative. Arthroscopic intervention has the advantages of smaller incisions, faster recovery of wrist function and less pain postoperative. Overall outcome of arthroscopy is not superior to the outcome in open surgery. Recurrence rates and final wrist function are similar.

=== Distal radius fracture ===
Distal radius fractures might occur when a person falls on an outstretched hand (FOOSH). Immediate pain, swelling and loss of wrist function are the most common symptoms. These fractures have wide variety of classification systems, but for arthroscopic intervention a difference is made between extra- or intra-articular fractures. Arthroscopy can be used to treat an intra-articular distal radius fracture and at the same time examine the Scapholunate ligament, Lunotriquetral ligament and articular disk. The shifted bone segment is relocated, in necessary a bone autograft can be used to fill up the fracture. At the end the fracture is stabilized using percutane wires. Arthroscopy has good results as treatment for distal radius fracture, with over 85% of the patiënts showing good to excellent postoperative results.

=== Diagnostic uses ===
Persistent pain in the wrist after conservative treatment is the major indication for a diagnostic wrist arthroscopy. Conservative treatment consists of wrist immobilization, oral NSAIDs and/or injection with corticoids. Diagnostic wrist arthroscopy may also be indicated when other imaging techniques, such as MRI and ultrasonography, need confirmation on observed uncertainties or when other imaging techniques failed to establish a clear diagnosis. This makes arthroscopy an important diagnostic tool for some common anomalies around the wrist. However, relying on arthroscopic findings in the setting of an unclear preoperative diagnosis yields limited diagnostic benefit. Therefore, its use should be limited to the cases with other objective clinical findings.

Diagnostic indications	Explanation
Ganglion	A cavity in a joint capsule filled with thick fluid
SL-lesion	Tear of the scapholunate ligament
LT-lesion	Tear of the lunotriquetral ligament
TFCC-lesion	Tear in the TFCC. Classification according Palmer Classification in traumatic or degenerative lesion.
Synovitis	Inflammation of the synovial membrane
Cartilage decrease	A short of cartilage can cause arthritis.

== Procedure ==
Before surgery can begin, the patient has to be positioned in such a way that the wrist is stabilized. In order to do this, the patient has to be placed on the operating table with their face upward. The wrist of the arm on which will be operated on, has to be placed on a separate operating table on the side of the other operating table. To properly stabilize the wrist, the patient's elbow is flexed and the forearm is immobilized by using a traction apparatus. By using a traction apparatus, it will also become easier to insert the instruments.

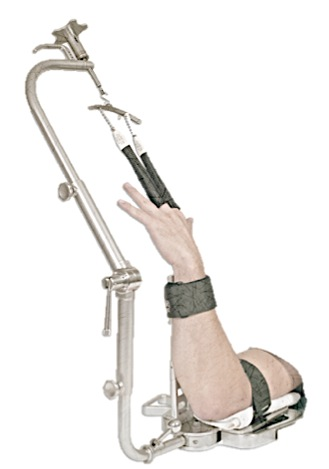
Traction tower

In general, 4.5-6.8 kilograms of traction is implemented with the aid of finger traps. The surgeon can either opt for nylon finger traps or for wire traps. In most cases, nylon finger traps will be preferred to wire traps, as nylon is a more resilient material and thus distributes the traction force to the skin more evenly. Usually, traction is applied to two fingers, namely the index finger and middle finger. Sometimes it may be necessary to more evenly distribute the traction force on the skin, as the patient's skin may be too fragile or atrophic. The traction brought about by the traction apparatus is then applied to three or even four fingers. The surgeon can either opt for dry arthroscopy or for wet arthroscopy. When performing a dry procedure the wrist can still, if necessary, be approached using open surgery. This may, for example, be required when a TFCC lesion is diagnosed. The latter is not possible when a wet procedure is performed, because the fluid that is used causes expansion of the tissue. To improve visualization within the wrist, an inflow irrigation system is used during surgery. Currently, several systems are available, such as gravity flow, a hand pump, large syringes, or a mechanical infusion pump. For irrigation, lactated Ringer's solution is generally used. The characteristics of lactated Ringer’s solution are that it is physiological and rapidly absorbed. Moreover, the right equipment must be available to finish a complete diagnostic arthroscopy, as well as to perform various operative procedures. Complications of using an irrigation system is that fluid extravasation into the soft tissues of the forearm can result in a compartment syndrome.

=== Materials ===
To perform a wrist arthroscopy, the surgeon can use a standard arthroscopy set. This set contains a variety of tools for both a diagnostic and therapeutic arthroscopic intervention. The sets currently available contain: scopes; probes; punches; graspers; joint shavers and electrocautery. To get a clear view of the wrist a high quality camera with a small diameter between 2 and 3 mm is needed. This camera is attached to a fiberoptic light source and shows the image of the inside of the joint. Probes are used for examination of internal structures by palpating, pulling of moving tissue. They are essential for diagnostic investigation of the joint. All probes bear markings at 5 mm intervals to indicate the scale, since the cameras used in arthroscopy have different magnifications. Punches or basket forceps have sharp edges to cut away redundant and damaged tissue. Suction punches are punches which can be connected to a suction pump to immediately remove cut tissue from the joint. Graspers or grasping forceps are useful to grab tissue floating loosely through the joint. A surgeon might want to remove this particular piece of tissue for tactile feedback. Every different arthroscopic intervention has its own set of tools, depending on difficulty, type of tissue and available working space.

=== Techniques ===
In recent years, wrist arthroscopy is becoming a more familiar technique for the diagnosis and treatment of various wrist abnormalities. Individual surgeons have their own preferences concerning the variety of available techniques. In this subsection, not all techniques will be described. A description of the most commonly used techniques will be given.

==== Before surgery ====
To prevent postoperative infections, the amount of pathogens in the operating room has to be minimized. In order to achieve this, the surgeon, assistants, equipment and the operation area have to be sterile during the operation. Furthermore, the doors in the operating room should not be opened, or this should at least be limited. Before the patient can undergo wrist arthroscopy, they must be positioned in a specific way. This operation procedure has already been thoroughly described earlier in subsection ‘’Procedure’’. The patient will only be operated on when every requirement for surgery is implemented.

==== Entrance ====
To perform wrist arthroscopy, the instruments are inserted in the wrist. The surgeon starts by making a small incision for creating a portal. The different portals are further discussed in the next section. After the incision has been made, the portal is used to insert a scope. This scope will provide the visualization. In that way, the surgeon can orient within the joint of the wrist. Once a clear view of the wrist is obtained, a possible problem can be identified. This problem, for example a TFCC lesion, may then immediately be solved by operative treatment.

=== Portals ===
A patient may suffer from various illnesses regarding the wrist. Examples include TFCC lesion, scapholunate and lunotriquetral instability, ganglions, and synovitis. These illnesses concern many different tissues and structures. By using just one portal, one cannot visualize all these structures and tissues. For that reason, several portals exist, each having its own function (Table 1). The traditional portals are at the back of the hand (dorsal side), because many neurovascular structures are at risk at the palmar side of the hand.

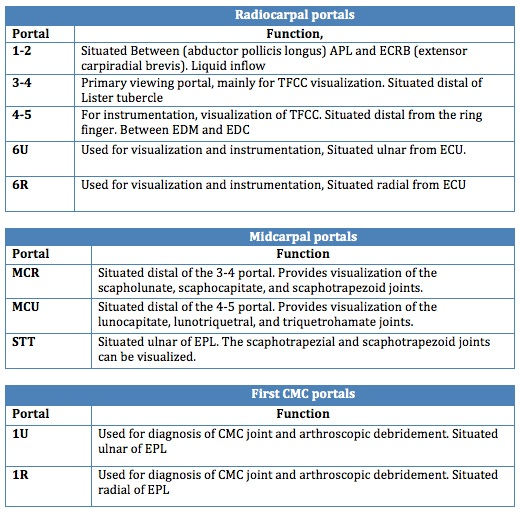
Table 1. Different portals that can be used during wrist arthroscopy

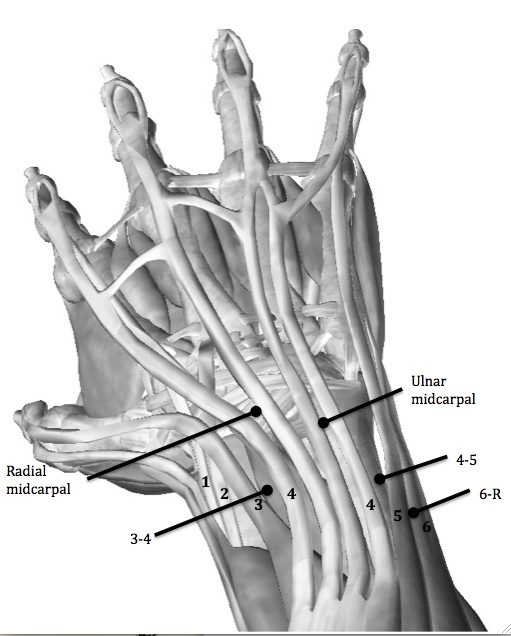
Location of the portals used for wrist arthroscopy

Dorsal radial portals: The portals lay between the dorsal extensor compartments.

1-2 portal:

- Between the 1st and 2nd extensor compartments
- Located in the anatomical snuffbox
- Not often utilized

3-4 portal:

- Between the 3rd and 4th extensor compartments
- Located distal to Lister's tubercle
- Primary viewing portal

4-5 portal:

- Between the 4th and 5th extensor compartments
- Mainly for instrumentation and visualization of TFCC

6R portal:

- At the radial side of the extensor carpi ulnaris (ECU)
- For TFCC repair

6U portal:

- Located at the ulnar side of the extensor carpi ulnaris (ECU)
- For TFCC repair

Volar radiocarpal (VR) portal

- This portal is used for evaluating the dorsal radiocarpal ligament (DRCL) and scapholunate interosseus ligament (SLIL).

Midcarpal portals:

Midcarpal radial portal (MCR)

- Allows visualization of the scapholunate (SL), scaphocapitate (SC) and scaphotrapezoid (ST) joints

Midcarpal ulnar portal (MCU)

- Allows visualization of the lunocapitate (LC), lunotriquetral (LT) and triquetrohamate (TH) joints

Dorsal distal radioulnar joint portal (DDRUJ)

- Both the proximal and distal DRUJ can be used.
- It is the best way to get a clear view of the DRUJ.

Volar distal radioulnar joint portal (VDRUJ)

- Used for assessing the TFCC attachment
