= Toshiba W31T =

2005 mobile phone model

W31T
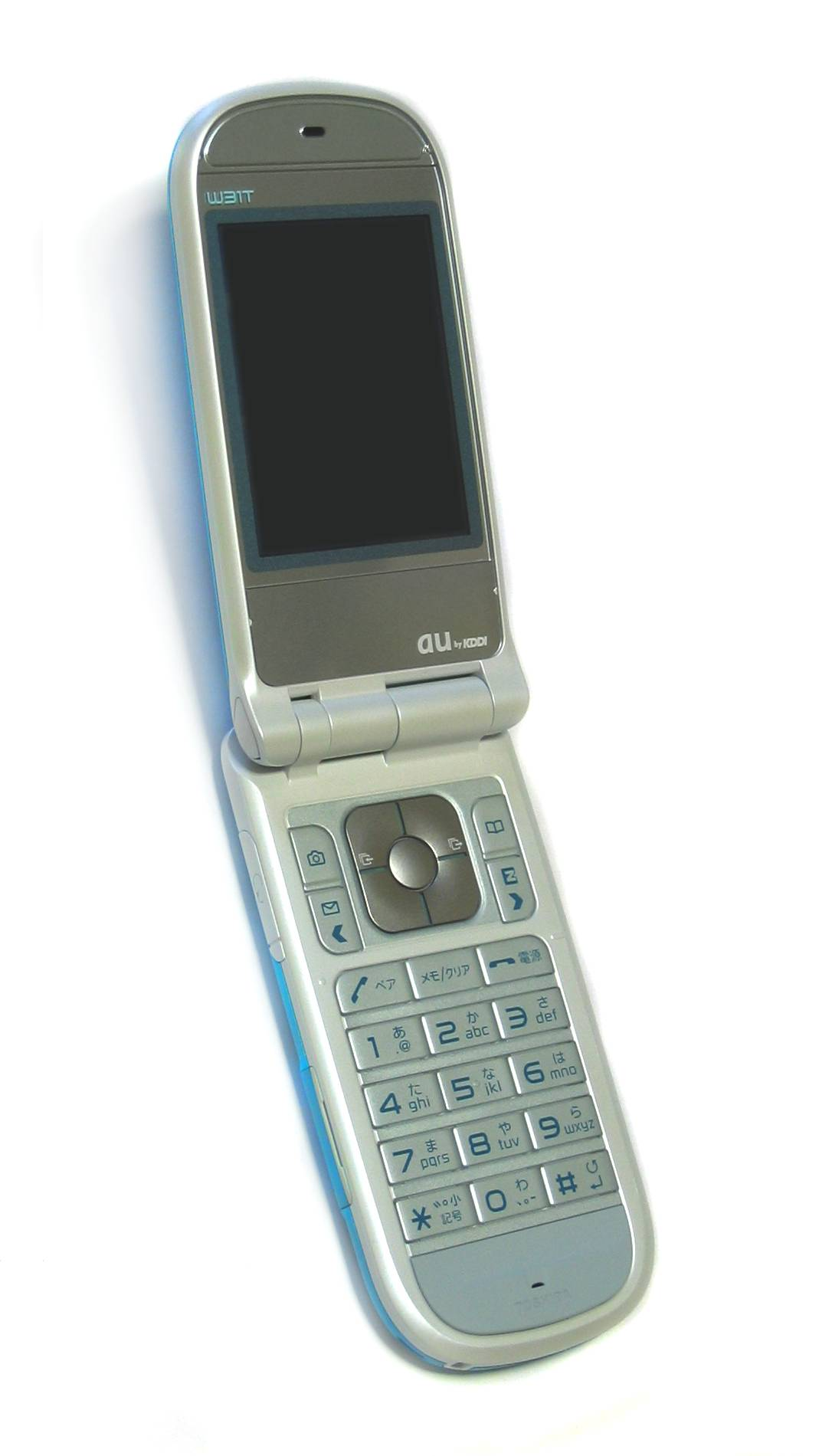
- W31T (Blue Quartz)
- Brand: au
- Manufacturer: Toshiba
- Type: Feature phone
- First released: June 30, 2005
- Discontinued: December 2005
- Predecessor: W21T
- Successor: W32T
- Compatible networks: CDMA2000 1xRTT (CDMA 1X WIN)
- Form factor: Clamshell
- Colors: Blue Quartz; Salty White; Tarmac Grey
- Dimensions: 103 mm (4.1 in) H 50 mm (2.0 in) W 20 mm (0.79 in) D
- Weight: 116 g (4.1 oz)
- Operating system: REX OS + KCP
- CPU: Qualcomm MSM6550 @ 225 MHz
- GPU: Toshiba MOBILE TURBO T4G (TC35285)
- Storage: 16 MB (5 MB dedicated to BREW)
- Removable storage: miniSD (up to 256 MB)
- Charging: 120 minutes
- Rear camera: 2.36 MP CCD
- Front camera: None
- Display: Main: 2.4 in (61 mm) Polysilicon TFT LCD, 240×320 pixels (QVGA), 262,144 colors Sub: 1.1 in (28 mm) TFCC LCD, 112×112 pixels, 65,536 colors

The W31T is a CDMA 1X WIN (now au 3G) mobile phone developed for the Japanese market by Toshiba (and Toshiba Mobile Communications, now FCNT). It was released under the au brand operated by KDDI and Okinawa Cellular Telephone.

== History ==
Introduced as an evolution of the W21T, the W31T was Toshiba's first mobile phone to support the BREW version of the Opera browser, known as "PC Site Viewer" (service ended March 31, 2016). At 20 mm thick, it was marketed as the thinnest clamshell CDMA 1X WIN handset available at its launch in June 2005. It was also the first device to feature both the KCP (KDDI Common Platform) and BREW 3.1.

- May 23, 2005: Officially announced by KDDI and Toshiba.
- June 30, 2005: Released nationwide across Japan.
- December 2005: Discontinued and replaced by its upgraded successor, the W32T.
- July 22, 2012: Service termination of the legacy 800 MHz frequency band (CDMA Band Class 3) rendered the handset completely unusable for voice calls and data transmission.

== Specifications ==
=== Hardware ===
- Form Factor: Clamshell fold design with frameless large numeric keypad
- Audio: Front-facing stereo speakers powered by a Yamaha MA-5 sound chip capable of up to 64-polyphonic ringtones
- Graphics Accelerator: MOBILE TURBO T4G (TC35285) 3D graphics engine
- Connectivity: Bluetooth v1.1
- SAR Level: 0.739 W/kg

It has a battery life of ~200 minutes for talk, ~280 hours of standby, and a charging time of ~120 minutes.

It features a 2.36 MP CCD camera.

=== Software ===
- Operating System: REX OS with KCP
- Platform: BREW 3.1
- Web & Media Services:
  - PC Site Viewer (Opera web browser)
  - EZ "Chaku-Uta Full" (pre-installed with "Sakuranbo" by Ai Otsuka as a sample track)
  - "KikaseteseSearch" (music identification)
  - EZ Movie & Chaku-Flash (animations)
  - EZ Channel & Anshin Navi
  - EZ Navi Walk (3D navigation support added via separate download) & EZ Passenger Navi
- Additional Features: First au phone to feature scalable fonts, over-the-air handset software updating, and an included electronic dictionary ("Ji-Supa") stored on an included 16 MB miniSD card and CD-ROM.

== Notes ==
- Recipient of the 2005 Good Design Award.

== See also ==
- Ai Otsuka – Commercial spokesperson for the product
- W32T
- W41T
- W43T
