= Ulnocarpal ligament =

Ulnocarpal ligament may refer to:

- Dorsal ulnocarpal ligament
- Palmar ulnocarpal ligament
