= Internal lateral ligament =

Internal lateral ligament may refer to:

- Ulnar carpal collateral ligament
- Ulnar collateral ligament of elbow joint
