= Lister's tubercle =

Bony prominence on the dorsal side of the dital radius

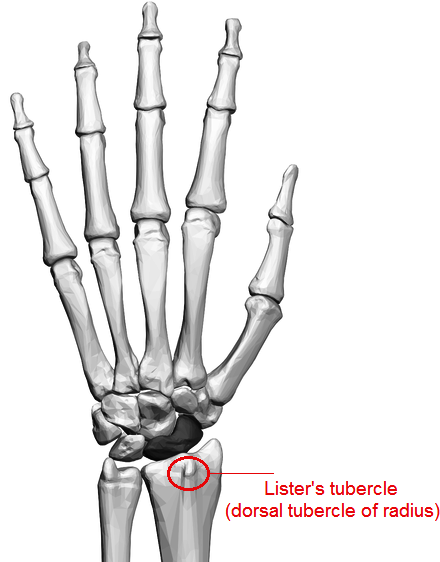
- Left hand. Lister's tubercle shown.

Details

Identifiers
- Latin: tuberculum dorsale
- TA98: A02.4.05.017
- TA2: 1226
- FMA: 23527

Lister's tubercle or dorsal tubercle of radius is a bony prominence located at the distal end of the radius. It is palpable on the dorsum of the wrist. It is named after Joseph Lister, though there is no evidence that he first described or identified it.

== Structure ==
Lister's tubercle is found on the dorsal distal radius. It varies in size and shape significantly. It can range from around 2 to 6 mm in height (averaging 3 mm), and around 6 to 26 mm in length (averaging 13 mm). Lister's tubercle consists of two peaks including radial peak and ulnar peak.

== Function ==
Lister's tubercle serves as a pulley for the tendon of extensor pollicis longus, which wraps around the medial side and takes a 45° turn.

== Clinical significance ==
Lister's tubercle is used as a useful landmark during wrist arthroscopy and other wrist surgery. It is palpable on the dorsum of the wrist. It is often difficult to clearly distinguish with radiography.

Hyperextension of the wrist can lead to fracture of Lister's tubercle, as pressure is increased from the extensor pollicis longus tendon. An "island-shaped" fracture can also expose the tendon to a rough edge and lead to tendon rupture (usually long after the initial fracture).
