= Radioulnar ligament =

Radioulnar ligament can refer to:

- Dorsal radioulnar ligament (ligamentum radioulnare dorsale)
- Palmar radioulnar ligament (ligamentum radioulnare palmare)
