= Palmar ulnocarpal ligament =

Ligament of the wrist

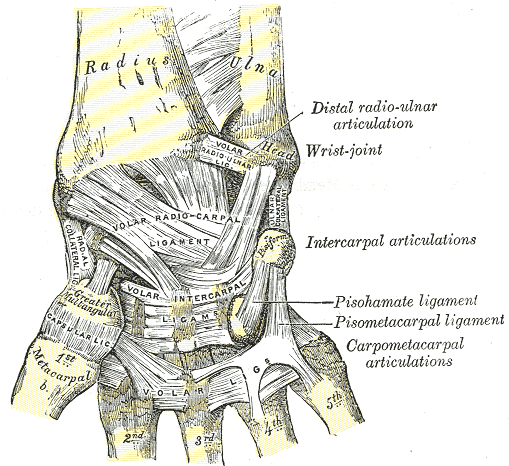
- Ligaments of wrist. Anterior view. (Palmar ulnocarpal ligament visible but not labeled.)

Details
- From: Ulnar styloid process
- To: Carpus

Identifiers
- Latin: ligamentum ulnocarpale palmare
- TA98: A03.5.11.006
- TA2: 1795
- FMA: 40004

The palmar ulnocarpal ligament is a ligament of the radiocarpal joint.

It consists of ulnolunate, ulnocapitate, and ulnotriquetal ligaments.
