= Dorsal ulnocarpal ligament =

Ligament of the wrist

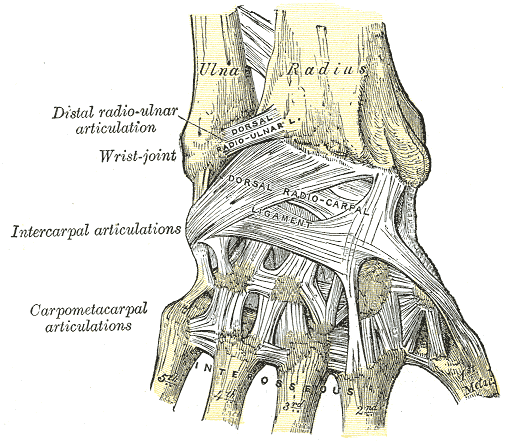
- Ligaments of wrist. Posterior view. (Dorsal ulnocarpal ligament not labeled, but region visible at left.)

Details
- From: Ulna
- To: Carpus

Identifiers
- Latin: ligamentum ulnocarpale dorsale
- TA98: A03.5.11.005
- TA2: 1794
- FMA: 40003

The dorsal ulnocarpal ligament is a ligament in the hand. It is a fibrous band passing from the styloid process of the ulna to the dorsal aspect of the carpal bones.
