= Dorsal radioulnar ligament =

Ligament of the wrist

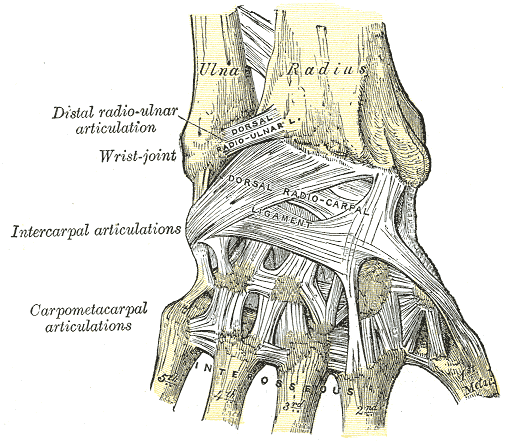
- Ligaments of wrist. Posterior view.

Details
- From: Radius
- To: Ulna

Identifiers
- Latin: ligamentum radioulnaris dorsale
- TA2: 1784

The dorsal radioulnar ligament (posterior radioulnar ligament) extends between corresponding surfaces on the dorsal aspect of the distal radioulnar articulation.
