= Ulnar notch of the radius =

Anatomical landmark

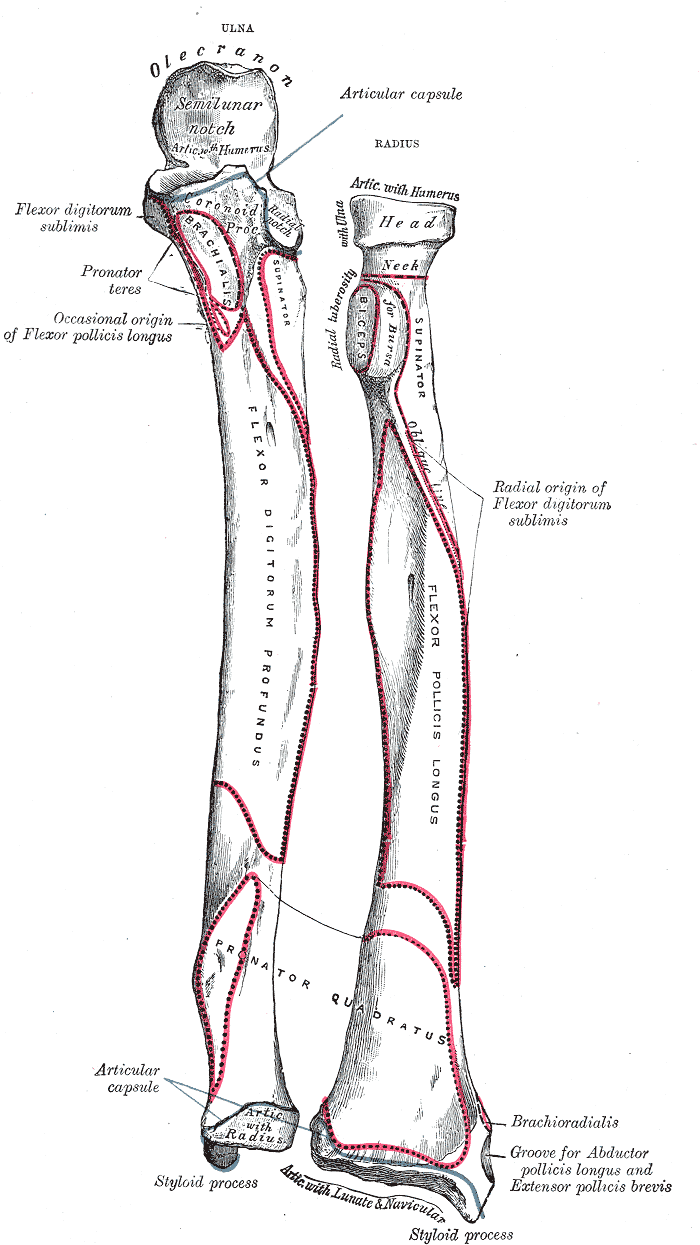
- Bones of left forearm. Anterior aspect. (Ulnar notch visible but not labeled.)

Details

Identifiers
- Latin: incisura ulnaris radii
- TA98: A02.4.05.019
- TA2: 1228
- FMA: 75082 23530, 75082

The articular surface for the ulna is called the ulnar notch (sigmoid cavity) of the radius; it is in the distal radius, and is narrow, concave, smooth, and articulates with the head of the ulna forming the distal radioulnar joint.
