= Ulnar styloid process =

Bony prominence at the wrist

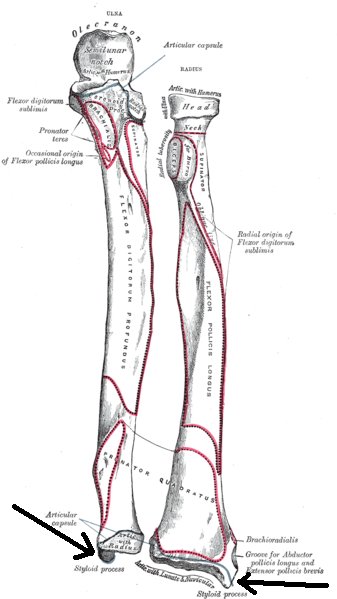
- Bones of left forearm seen from front (ulnar styloid process labeled at bottom left)

- Diagram of bones in the human arm

Details

Identifiers
- Latin: processus styloideus ulnae
- TA98: A02.4.06.017
- TA2: 1247
- FMA: 23628

The styloid process of the ulna is a bony prominence found at distal end of the ulna in the forearm.

== Structure ==
The styloid process of the ulna projects from the medial and back part of the ulna. It descends a little lower than the head. The head is separated from the styloid process by a depression for the attachment of the apex of the triangular articular disk, and behind, by a shallow groove for the tendon of the extensor carpi ulnaris muscle.

The styloid process of the ulna varies from 2 to 6 mm in length.

== Function ==
The rounded end of the styloid process of the ulna connects to the ulnar collateral ligament of the wrist. The radioulnar ligaments also attaches to the base of the styloid process of the ulna.

== Clinical significance ==
Fractures of the styloid process of the ulna rarely require treatment when they occur in association with a distal radius fracture. The major exception is when the joint between these bones, the distal radioulnar joint (or DRUJ), is unstable. When the DRUJ is unstable, the ulnar styloid may require independent treatment.

An excessively long styloid process of the ulna can cause painful contact with the triquetral bone in the wrist, known as ulnar styloid impaction syndrome. Radiology is used to diagnose it. Conservative management involves injection of triamcinolone, while surgery involves shortening of the styloid process of the ulna via resection.

The position of the styloid process of the ulna in relation to the wrist must be considered when applying a wrist splint. This is important in preventing pressure ischaemia.
