= Ulnar carpal collateral ligament =

Ligament of the wrist

Ulnar collateral ligament (wrist)
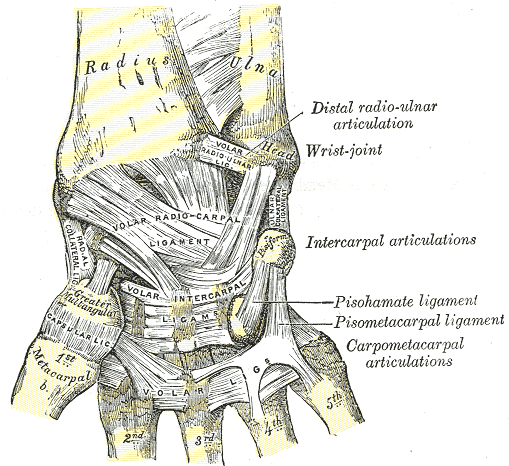
- Ligaments of wrist. Anterior view. (Ulnar collateral visible at center right.)

Details
- From: Ulnar styloid process
- To: Triquetral bone, pisiform bone

Identifiers
- Latin: ligamentum collaterale carpi ulnare
- TA98: A03.5.11.007
- TA2: 1800
- FMA: 40005

The ulnar collateral ligament (internal lateral ligament, ulnar carpal collateral ligament or ulnar collateral ligament of the wrist joint) is a rounded cord, attached above to the end of the styloid process of the ulna, and dividing below into two fasciculi, one of which is attached to the medial side of the triquetral bone, the other to the pisiform and flexor retinaculum.
