= Palmar radioulnar ligament =

Ligament of the wrist

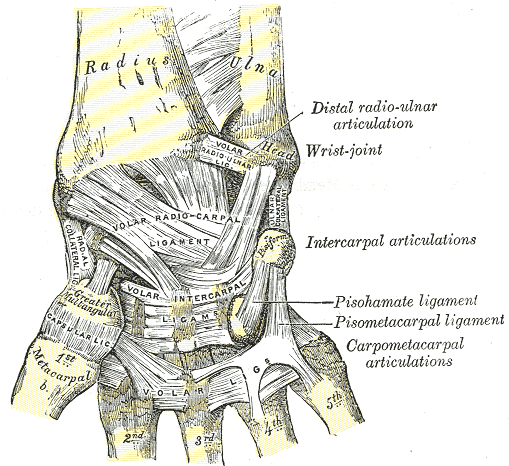
- Ligaments of wrist. Anterior view

Details
- From: Radius
- To: Ulna

Identifiers
- Latin: ligamentum radioulnare palmare
- TA2: 1785

The palmar radioulnar ligament (volar radioulnar ligament, anterior radioulnar ligament) is a narrow band of fibers extending from the anterior margin of the ulnar notch of the radius to the front of the head of the ulna.

It is sometimes abbreviated PRUL.
