= Distal radioulnar articulation =

Joint of the wrist

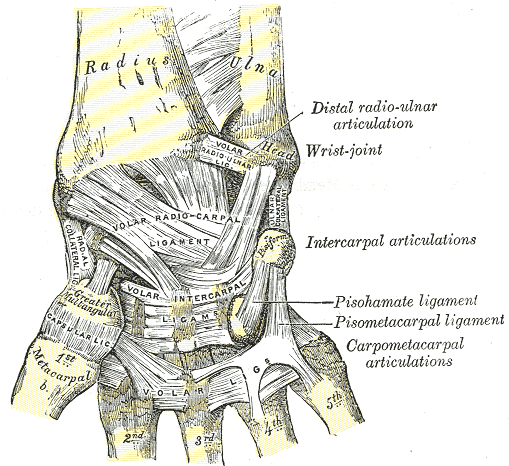
- Ligaments of wrist. Anterior view.

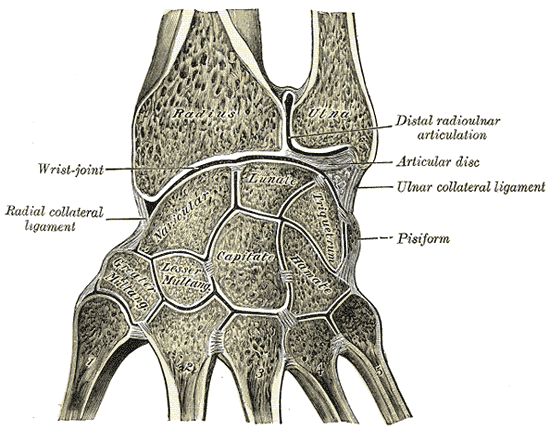
- Vertical section through the articulations at the wrist, showing the synovial cavities

Details
- Synonyms: Distal radioulnar joint (DRUJ)

Identifiers
- Latin: articulatio radioulnaris distalis
- TA98: A03.5.10.001
- TA2: 1781
- FMA: 35290

Distal radioulnar articulation, also known as the distal radioulnar joint, or inferior radioulnar joint is a synovial pivot joint between the two bones in the forearm; the radius and ulna. It is one of two joints between the radius and ulna, the other being the proximal radioulnar articulation. The joint features an articular disc, and is reinforced by the palmar and dorsal radioulnar ligaments.

== Structure ==
The distal radioulnar articulation is formed by the head of ulna, and the ulnar notch of the distal radius.

=== Articular disc ===
The joint features a triangular articular disc that is attached to the inferior margin of the ulnar notch by its base, and to a fossa at the base of the styloid process of the ulna by its apex. The articular disc acts to firmly bind the distal extremities of the two bones together.

=== Ligaments ===
The articulation is reinforced by the palmar radioulnar ligament, and dorsal radioulnar ligament.

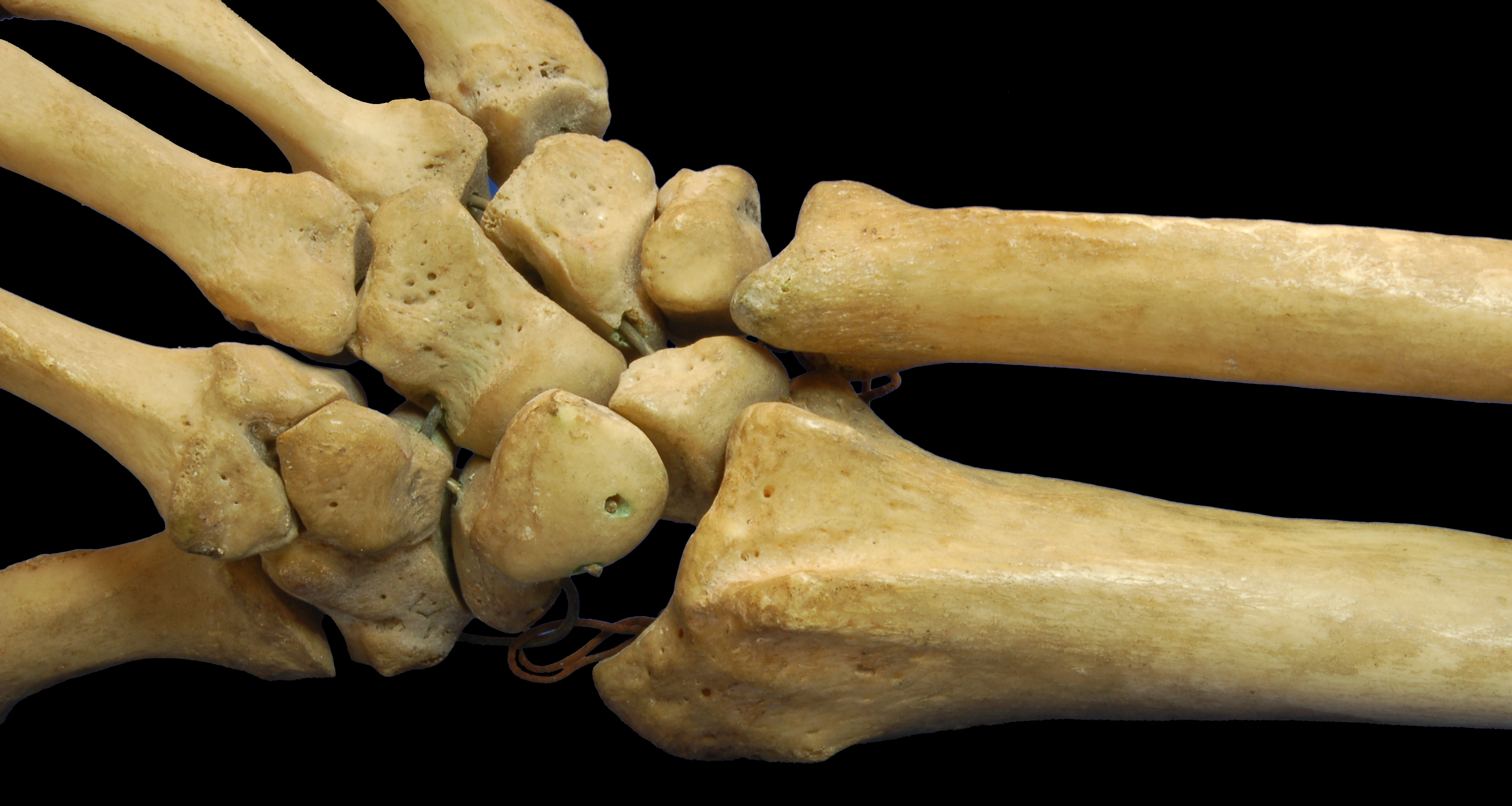
Distal ends of radius and ulna along with the bones of the wrist and hand

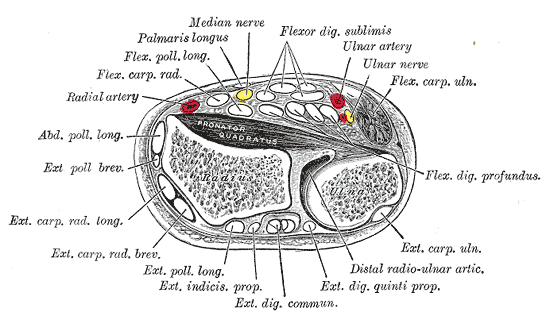
Transverse section across distal ends of radius and ulna.

== Function ==
The function of the radioulnar joint is to lift and maneuver weight load from the distal radioulnar joint to be distributed across the forearm's radius and ulna as a load-bearing joint. Supination of the radioulnar joint can move from 0 degrees neutral to approximately 80-90 degrees where pronation of the radioulnar joint can move from 0 degrees neutral to approximately 70-90 degrees. Supination (palms facing up) vs. pronation (palms facing down). Muscles that contribute to function are all supinator (biceps brachii, brachioradialis, and supinator) and pronator muscles (brachioradialis, pronator quadratus, and pronator peres).

== Clinical significance ==
Injuries to the distal radioulnar articulation often result from falls onto an outstretched hand. Injury can occur with concurrent fracture of the distal radius, the ulna, or can be isolated. For the upper limit of the distal radioulnar distance, sources vary between 2 mm and 5 mm. A classification system has been proposed by Estaminet and colleagues.

=== Estaminet classification ===
Estaminet classified injuries of the distal radioulnar articulation into four categories with two subclasses: purely ligamentous (subclass A) and those with associated boney injury (subclass B).

- Estaminet I - Attenuation on MRI only
- Estaminet II - Volar distal radioulnar ligament is involved. Unstable in supination. Fixation should be in pronation.
- Estaminet III - Dorsal distal radioulnar ligament is involved. Unstable in pronation. Fixation should be in supination.
- Estaminet IV - Both ligaments are involved. Unstable in both supination and pronation. Fixation is in neutral.
