= List of eponymous fractures =

Eponymous fractures
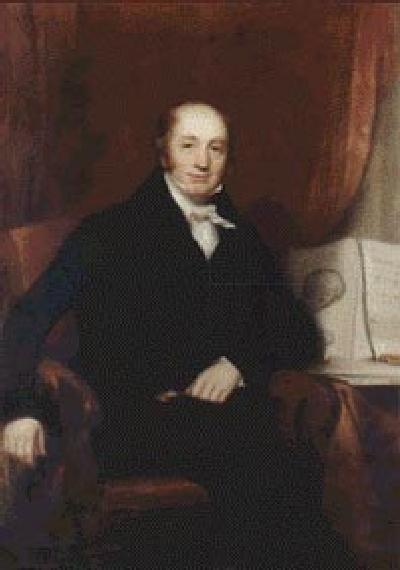
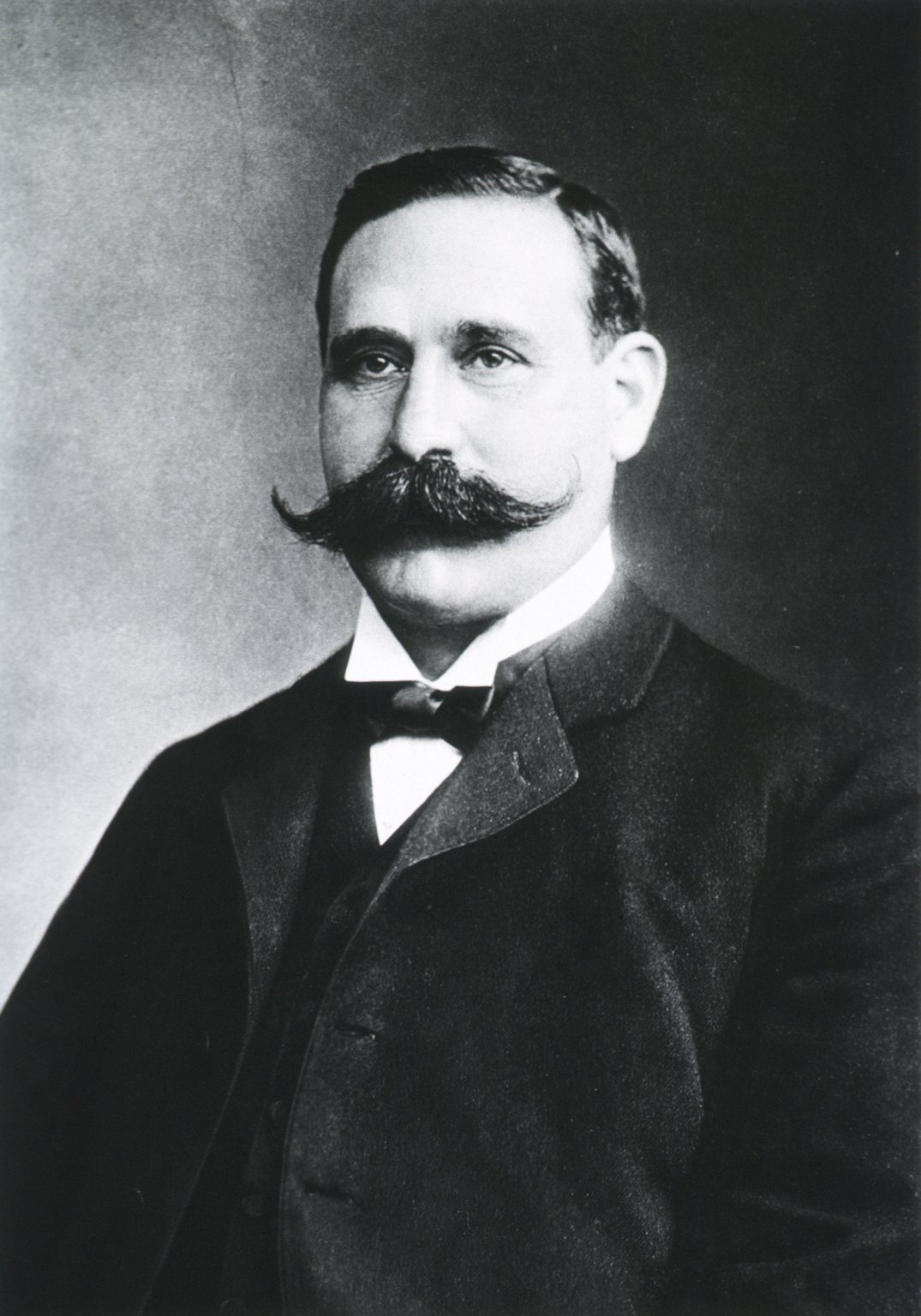
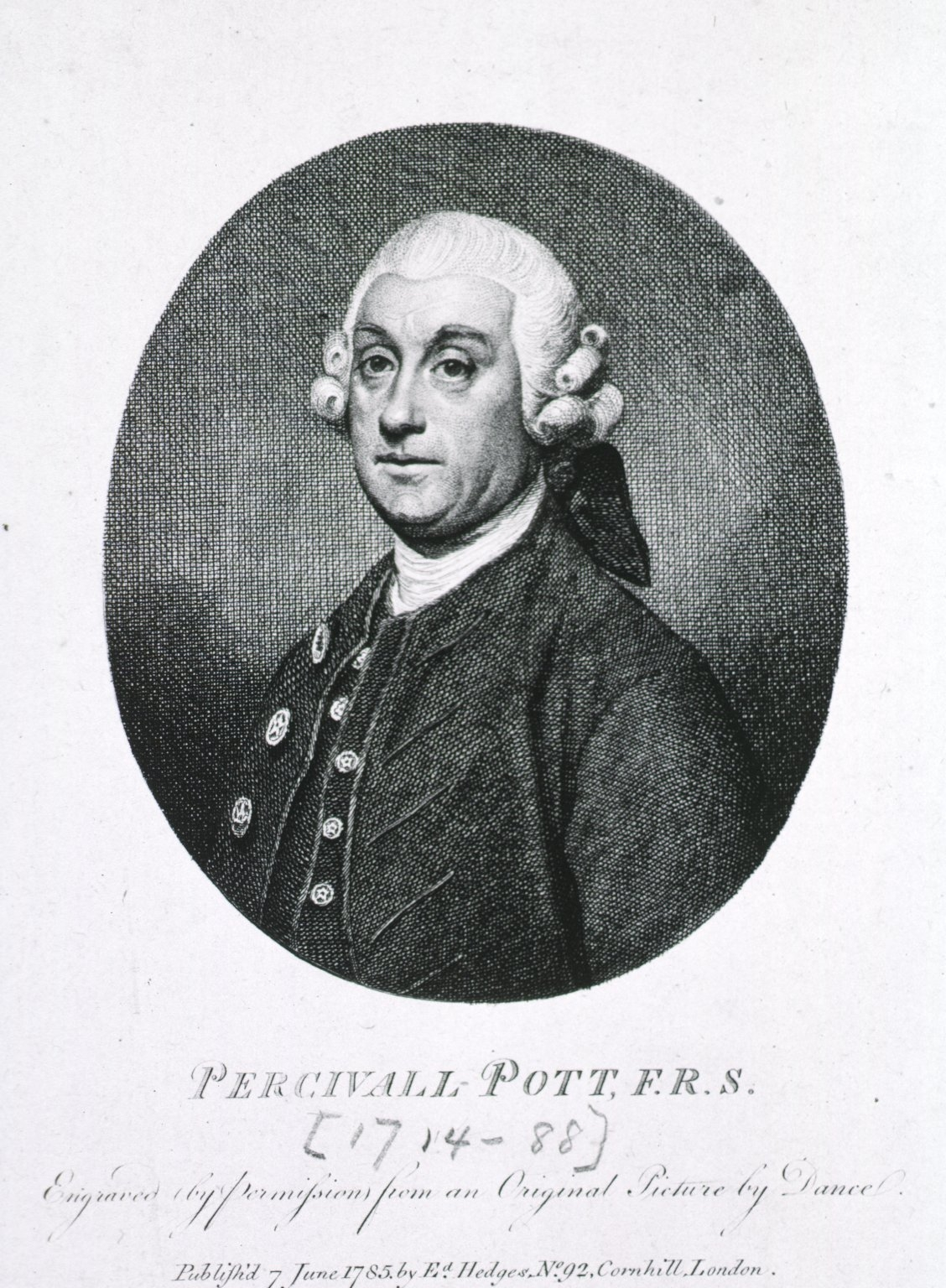
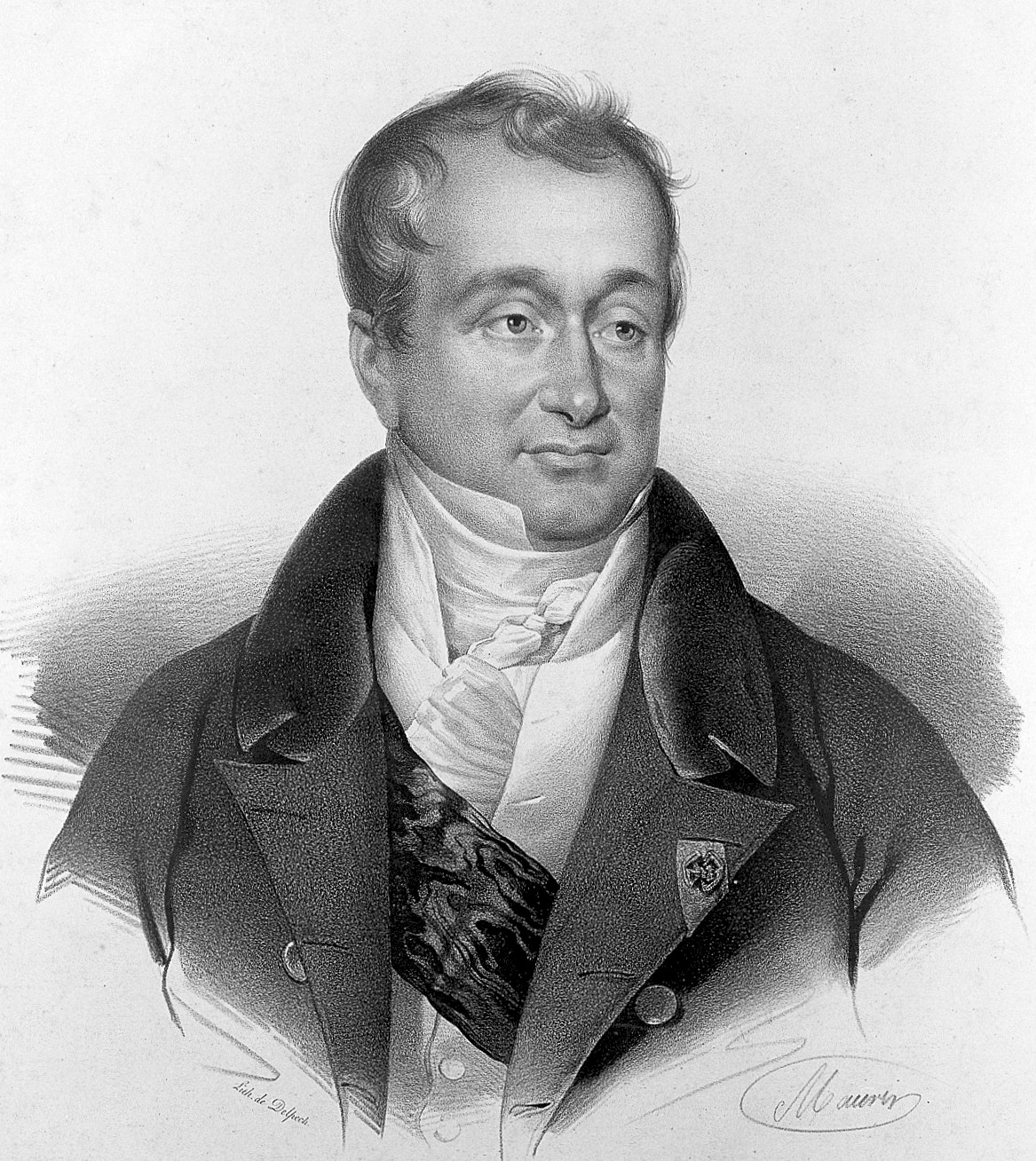
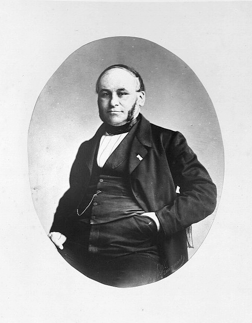
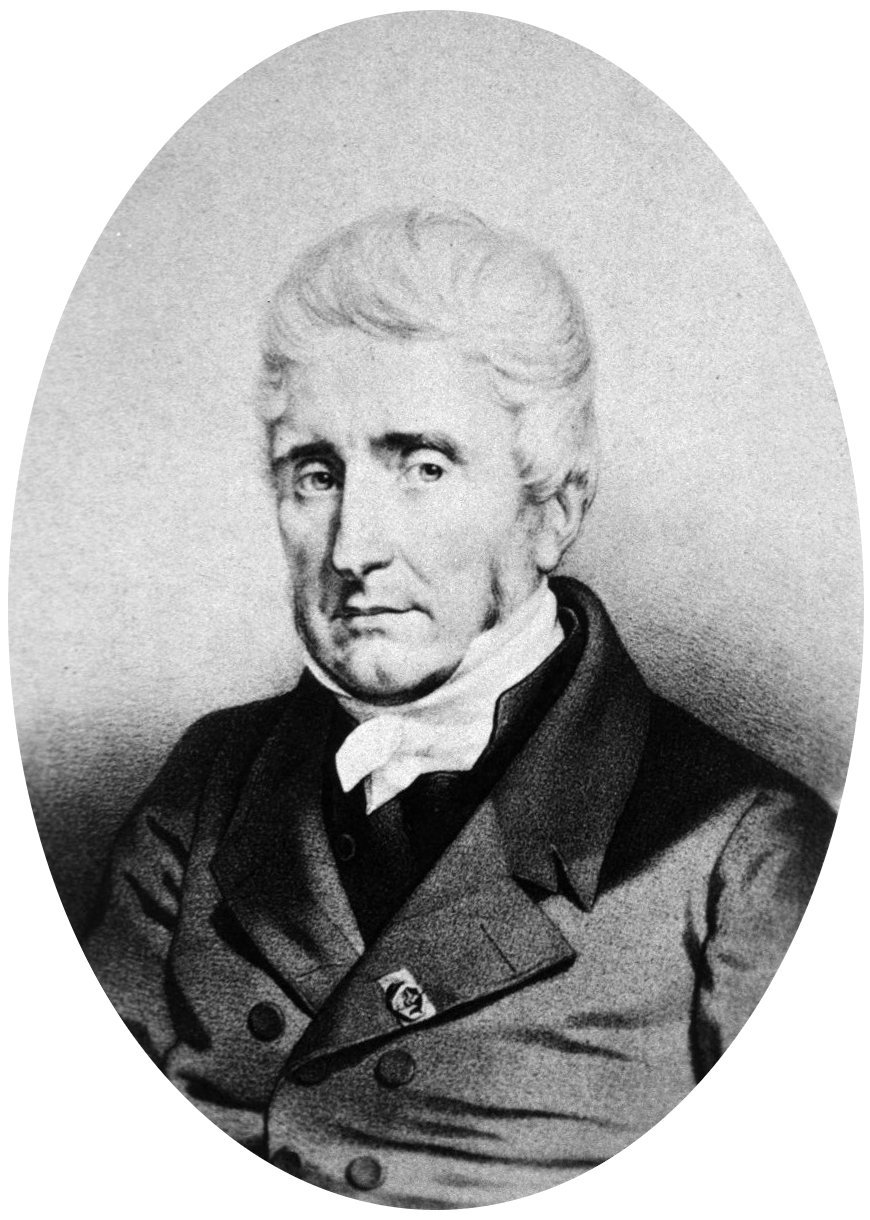
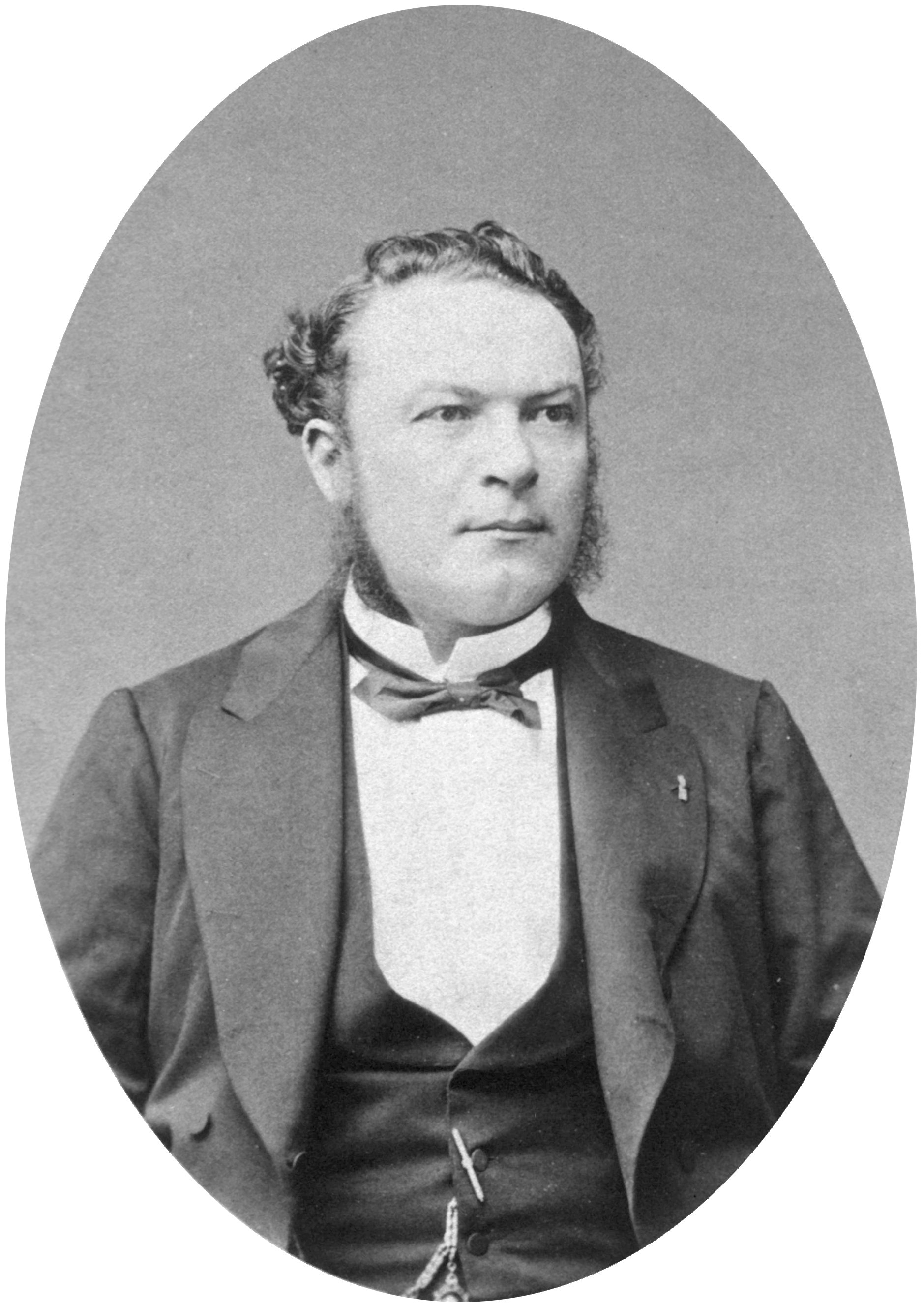
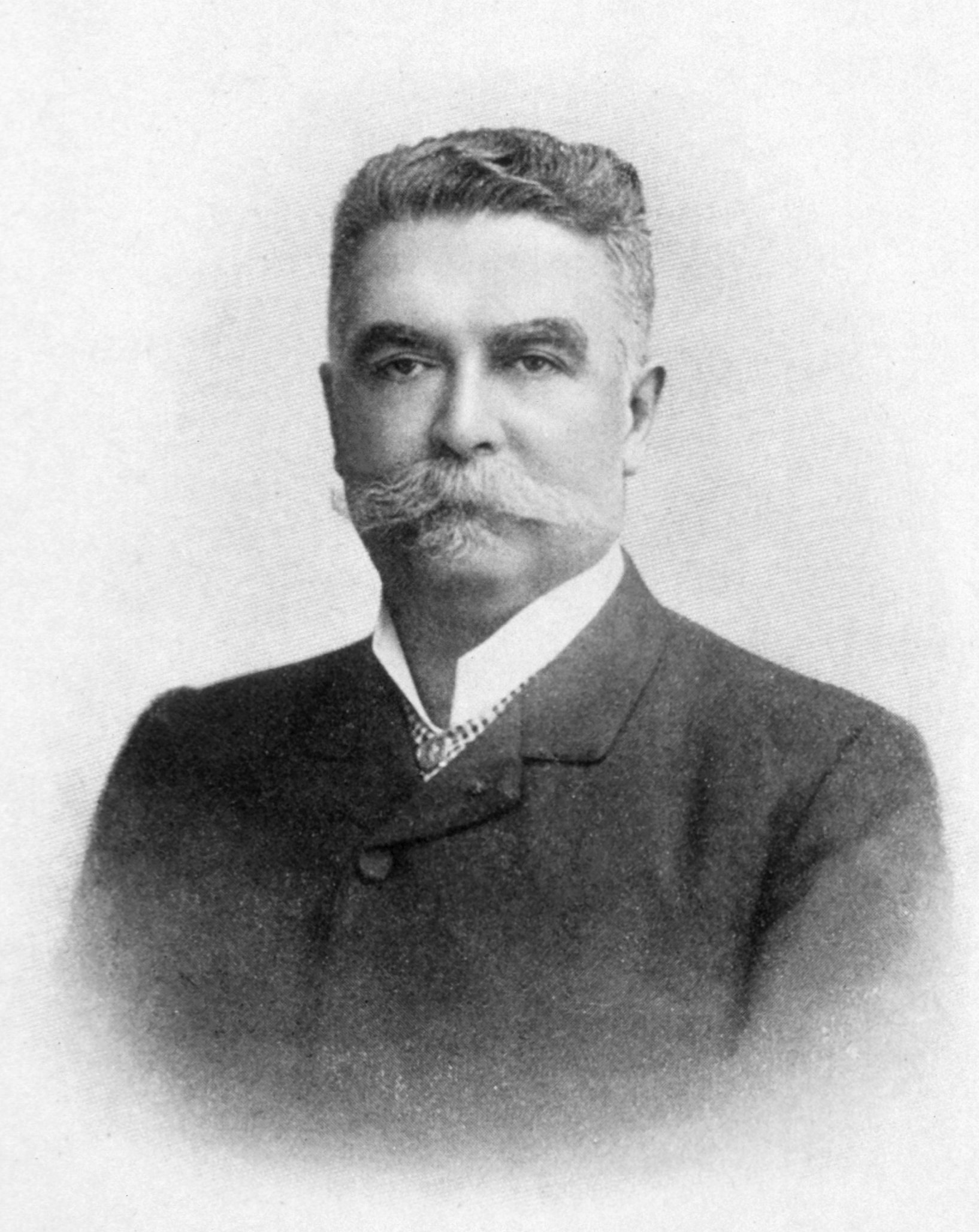
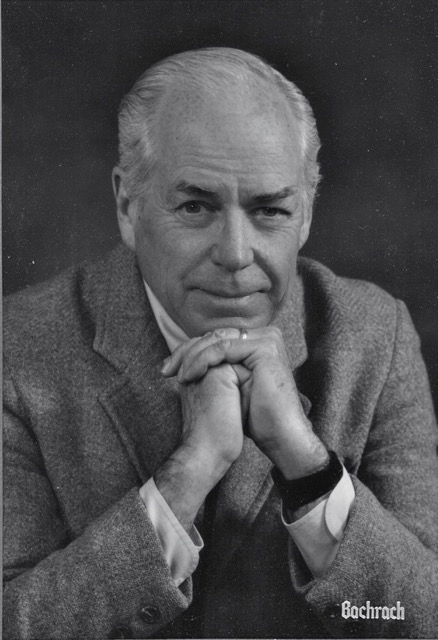
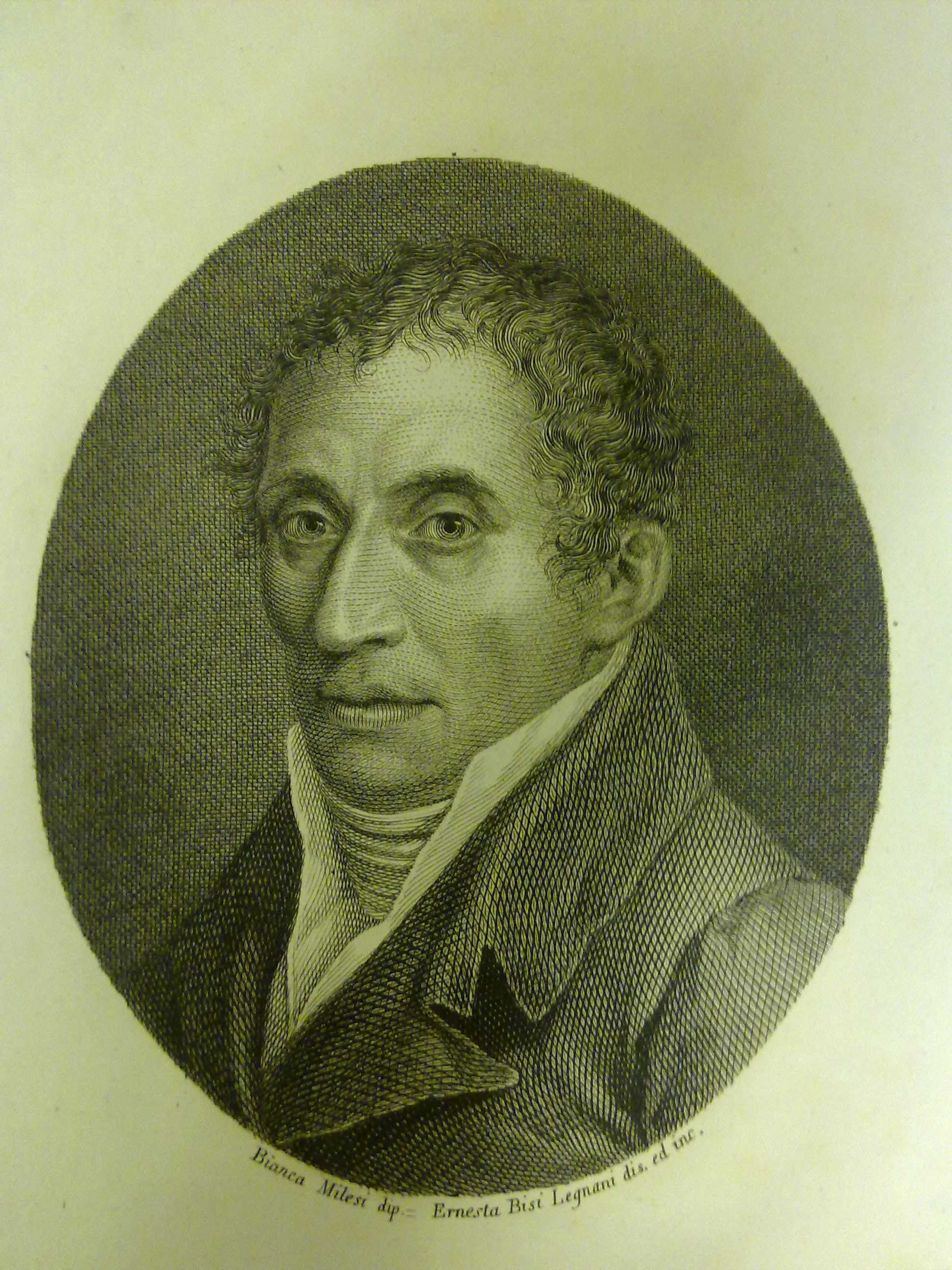
- Other names: Fractures with names Abraham Colles, Albert Hoffa, Percivall Pott, Guillaume Dupuytren, Léon Athanese Gosselin, Jacques Lisfranc, Paul Jules Tillaux, William H. Harris, Paul Segond, Giambattista Monteggia
- Specialty: Orthopedics

Eponymous fractures and fracture-dislocations are most commonly named after the doctor who first described them. They may also be named after an activity with which they are associated.

Some of these terms are historic.

Fracture	Named after	Description	Mechanism of injury	Reference
Bankart's fracture	Arthur Bankart	Fracture of anterior glenoid associated with anterior shoulder dislocation	External rotation and abduction of shoulder	
Barton's fracture	John Rhea Barton	distal radius fracture involving the articular surface with dislocation of the radiocarpal joint	fall on outstretched hand	Barton's fracture at Whonamedit?
Bennett's fracture	Edward Hallaran Bennett	intra-articular fracture of base of Thumb metacarpal	axial load along metacarpal in a partially flexed thumb	Bennett's fracture at Whonamedit?
Bosworth fracture	David M. Bosworth	fracture of distal fibula with posterior dislocation of the proximal fibula behind the tibia	severe external rotation of the foot	"Bosworth fracture dislocation". Medcyclopaedia. GE.
Boxer's fracture	Boxers	fracture at the neck of the fifth metacarpal	punching solid object	Boxer's fracture at Wheeless' Textbook of Orthopaedics online
Bumper fracture	Car bumper	compression fracture of lateral tibial plateau	forced valgus of knee when struck from side by car bumper	Bumper fracture at TheFreeDictionary.com
Chance fracture	George Quentin Chance	horizontal fracture of vertebral body	hyperflexion of spine, seen in car accidents when lap belts were used	Chance fracture at Wheeless' Textbook of Orthopaedics online
Chauffeur's fracture	Chauffeurs	intra-articular fracture of radial styloid	forced ulnar deviation of the wrist causing avulsion of the radial styloid	Chauffeur's fracture at Wheeless' Textbook of Orthopaedics online
Chopart's fracture-dislocation	François Chopart	foot dislocation through talonavicular and calcaneocuboid joints with associated fractures, usually after ankle twisting.treated in a non weight bearing cast for 6–8 weeks		Chopart's fracture dislocation at Whonamedit?
Clay shoveller's fracture	Clay shovellers	spinous process fracture of C6, C7 or T1	forced hyperflexion of neck	"Clay shovellers fracture". Medcyclopaedia. GE.
Colles' fracture	Abraham Colles	distal radius fracture with dorsal angulation, impaction and radial drift	fall on outstretched hand	Colles' fracture at Whonamedit?
Duverney fracture	Joseph Guichard Duverney	isolated fracture of the iliac wing	direct trauma	"Duverney fracture". Medcyclopaedia. GE.
Essex-Lopresti fracture	Peter Essex-Lopresti	comminuted radial head fracture with interosseous membrane disruption and distal radioulnar joint subluxation	fall from height	Essex Lopresti fracture at Wheeless' Textbook of Orthopaedics online
Galeazzi fracture	Ricardo Galeazzi	radius shaft fracture with dislocation of distal radioulnar joint	blow to forearm	Galeazzi fracture at eMedicine
Gosselin fracture	Leon Athanese Gosselin	V-shaped distal tibia fracture extending into the tibial plafond		Gosselin's fracture at TheFreeDictionary.com
Hangman's fracture	Hangman	fracture of both pedicles of C2	distraction and extension of neck	Hangman's fracture at Wheeless' Textbook of Orthopaedics online
Hill–Sachs fracture	Harold Arthur Hill; Maurice David Sachs	impacted posterior humeral head fracture occurring during anterior shoulder dislocation		Hill Sachs Lesion at Wheeless' Textbook of Orthopaedics online
Holstein–Lewis fracture	Arthur Holstein; Gwylim Lewis	fracture of the distal third of the humerus resulting in entrapment of the radial nerve		Holstein-Lewis fracture at Orthopedic Weblinks
Holdsworth fracture	Sir Frank Wild Holdsworth	unstable spinal fracture-dislocation at the thoracolumbar junction		Thoracic Spine Fractures and Dislocations at eMedicine
Hume fracture	A.C. Hume	olecranon fracture with anterior dislocation of radial head		Ronald McRae, Maxx Esser. Practical Fracture Treatment 5th edition, page 187. Elsevier Health Sciences, 2008. ISBN 978-0-443-06876-8.
Jefferson fracture	Sir Geoffrey Jefferson	fracture of first cervical vertebra	compression of neck	Jefferson fracture at Whonamedit?
Jones fracture	Sir Robert Jones	fracture of base of 5th metatarsal extending into intermetatarsal joint	inversion of ankle	Jones fracture at Wheeless' Textbook of Orthopaedics online
Le Fort fractures	René Le Fort	series of facial fractures	direct trauma to face	LeFort I at Whonamedit? LeFort II at Whonamedit? LeFort III at Whonamedit?
Le Fort's fracture of the ankle	Léon Clément Le Fort	vertical fracture of distal fibula with avulsion of medial malleolus		LeFort's fracture of the ankle at Whonamedit?
Lisfranc fracture	Jacques Lisfranc de St. Martin	fracture dislocation of midfoot	forced plantar flexion of foot or dropping heavy weight on foot	Lisfranc fracture at Whonamedit?
Maisonneuve fracture	Jules Germain François Maisonneuve	spiral fracture of proximal fibula	external rotation of ankle	Maisonneuve fracture at Wheeless' Textbook of Orthopaedics online
Malgaigne's fracture	Joseph-François Malgaigne	vertical pelvic fracture through both pubic rami and the ilium or sacroiliac joint with vertical displacement	high energy impact to pelvis (front to back)	Malgaigne's fracture at TheFreeDictionary.com
March fracture	Marching	stress fracture of a metatarsal shaft	heavy or unaccustomed exercise	Metatarsal Stress Fracture at eMedicine
Monteggia fracture	Giovanni Battista Monteggia	proximal ulna fracture with dislocation of radial head	blow to forearm	Monteggia fracture at Whonamedit?
Moore's fracture	Edward Mott Moore	distal radius fracture with ulnar dislocation and entrapment of styloid process under annular ligament		Moore's fracture at TheFreeDictionary.com
Pipkin fracture-dislocation	G. Pipkin	posterior dislocation of hip with avulsion fracture of fragment of femoral head by the ligamentum teres	impact to the knee with the hip flexed (dashboard injury)	Type II-V: Posterior Fracture Dislocations at Wheeless' Textbook of Orthopaedics online
Pott's fracture	Percival Pott	bimalleolar fracture of the ankle	eversion of ankle	Pott's fracture at Whonamedit?
Rolando fracture	Silvio Rolando	intra articular comminuted fracture of base of first metacarpal	axial load along the metacarpal causing splitting of the proximal articular surface	Rolando's fracture at Wheeless' Textbook of Orthopaedics online
Runner's fracture	Running	stress fracture of distal fibula 3–8 cm above the lateral malleolus	repeated axial stress on fibula	Google books result Marko Pećina, Ivan Bojanić. Overuse injuries of the Musculoskeletal System, page 331. Informa Health Care, 2004. ISBN 978-0-8493-1428-5.
Salter–Harris fracture	R.B. Salter, W.R. Harris	fractures involving a growth plate	various	Salter–Harris fractures at Medscape
Segond fracture	Paul Segond	lateral tibial plateau avulsion fracture with anterior cruciate ligament tear	internal rotation of the knee	Segond fracture at Whonamedit?
Shepherd's fracture	Francis J. Shepherd	fracture of the lateral tubercle of the posterior process of the talus		Shepherd's fracture at Mondofacto online medical dictionary
Smith's fracture	Robert William Smith	distal radius fracture with volar displacement	fall on outstretched hand with wrist in flexed position	Smith's fracture at Whonamedit?
Stieda fracture	Alfred Stieda	avulsion fracture of the medial femoral condyle at the origin of the medial collateral ligament		Stieda's fracture at TheFreeDictionary.com
Tillaux fracture	Paul Jules Tillaux	Salter–Harris III fracture of the tibia	forced lateral rotation of foot	Tillaux fracture at Whonamedit?
Toddler's fracture	Toddlers	undisplaced spiral fracture of distal tibia in children under 8 years old	low-energy trauma, often rotational	The toddler's fracture revisited at Wheeless' Textbook of Orthopaedics online
