= Ulna fracture =

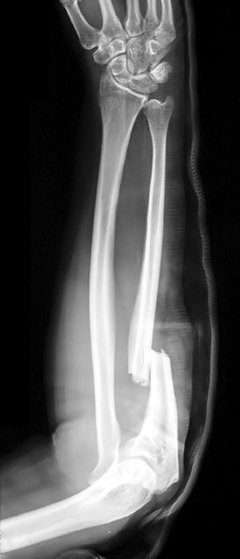
- Monteggia Fracture (type of ulna fracture)
- Types: Nightstick fracture; Monteggia fracture; Galeazzi facture

An ulna fracture is a break in the ulna bone, one of the two bones in the forearm. It is often associated with a fracture of the other forearm bone, the radius.

An ulna fracture can be a single break as in a so called nightstick fracture, which can be caused by someone being hit on the inside of the forearm often by a stick, notably when they are holding their arm up to protect their head from injury. The ulna bone can also break after falling on the forearm or falling on an outstretched arm.

Ulna fractures are more common in both men and women before age 40 and women after age 60. Adolescents who play sports are at higher risk.

== Cause ==
An ulna fracture can be a single break as in a so called "nightstick fracture", which can be caused by someone being hit on the inside of the forearm often by a stick, notably when they are holding their arm up to protect their head from injury. An ulna fracture can also result from falling on the forearm or falling on an outstretched arm.

Other causes of ulna fractures include sporting injuries, road traffic incidents, falls from a height, and conditions such as osteoporosis and potentially both primary and secondary cancer.

== Diagnosis ==
The diagnosis of an ulna fracture is made after taking the persons history, which usually includes a history of forearm pain following trauma, and then examining the injured forearm followed by an x-ray of the relevant part.

=== Types ===
Fractures of the ulna can occur at different levels of the bone: near the wrist, in the middle or near the elbow. The fracture may be confined to the ulna or accompanied with damage to the radius or the wrist or elbow joints.

- Nightstick fracture is a fracture of the middle portion of the ulna without other fractures.
- Distal ulna fractures typically occur along with distal radius fractures.
- Hume fracture - a fracture of the olecranon with an associated anterior dislocation of the radial head.
- Monteggia fracture - a fracture of the near to elbow end of the ulna with the dislocation of the head of the radius at the elbow joint.
- Galeazzi fracture - not a fracture of the ulna but a displaced fracture of the radius accompanied by a dislocation of the ulna at the wrist, where the radius and ulna come together.
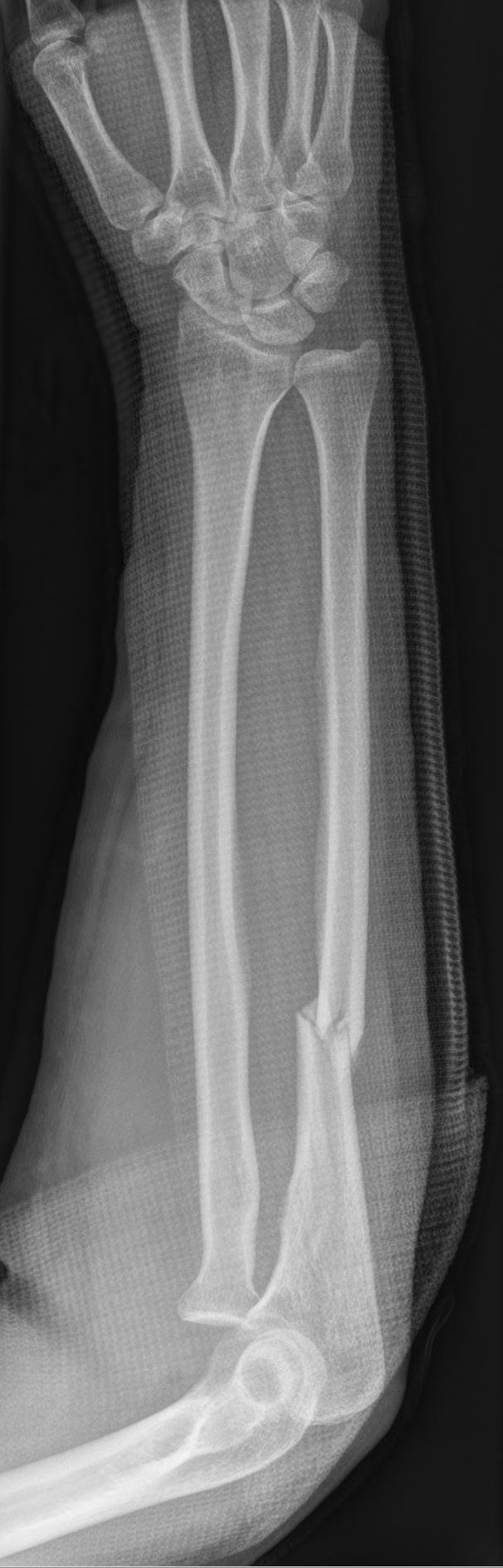
Monteggia Fracture (fracture of proximal ulna)

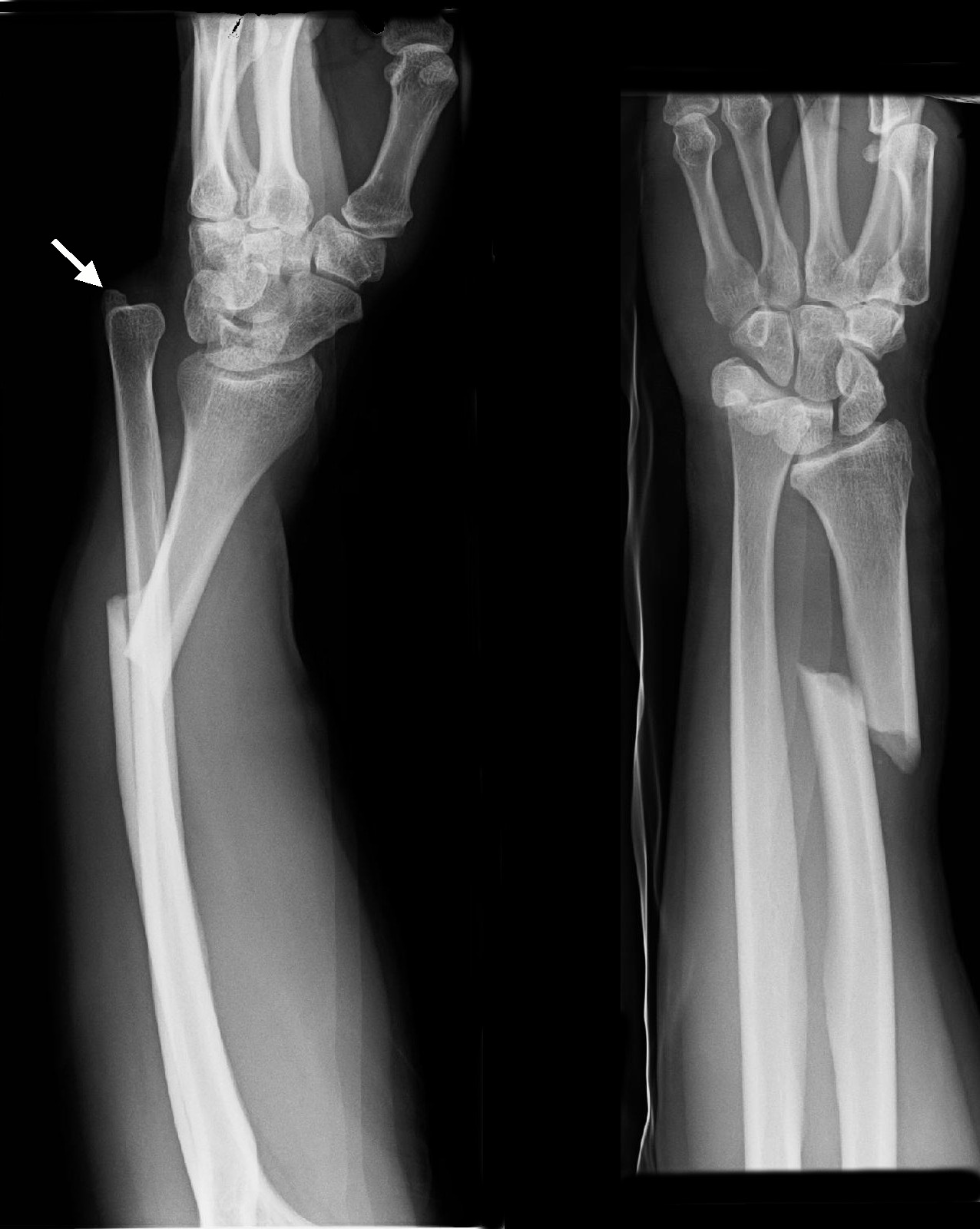
Galeazzi facture (displaced fracture of the radius)

== Treatment ==
If the fracture is not displaced, is stable, and is not associated with another fracture, it may be treated with a cast for around five to six weeks. During the recovery period healing can be followed up with x-rays. Heavy lifting should be avoided. After the cast has been removed exercises are encouraged and full strength is regained over time. Treatment may also be with splinting and early movement.

When there is a displaced fracture and also when the radioulnar joints are involved an operation is often performed, using either flexible rods or screws and plates in order to reduce the fracture and immobilise the bone.

== Epidemiology ==
Ulna fractures are more common in both men and women before age 40 and women after age 60, which is related to osteoporosis. Adolescents who play sports are also particularly at risk of an ulna fracture.

== History ==
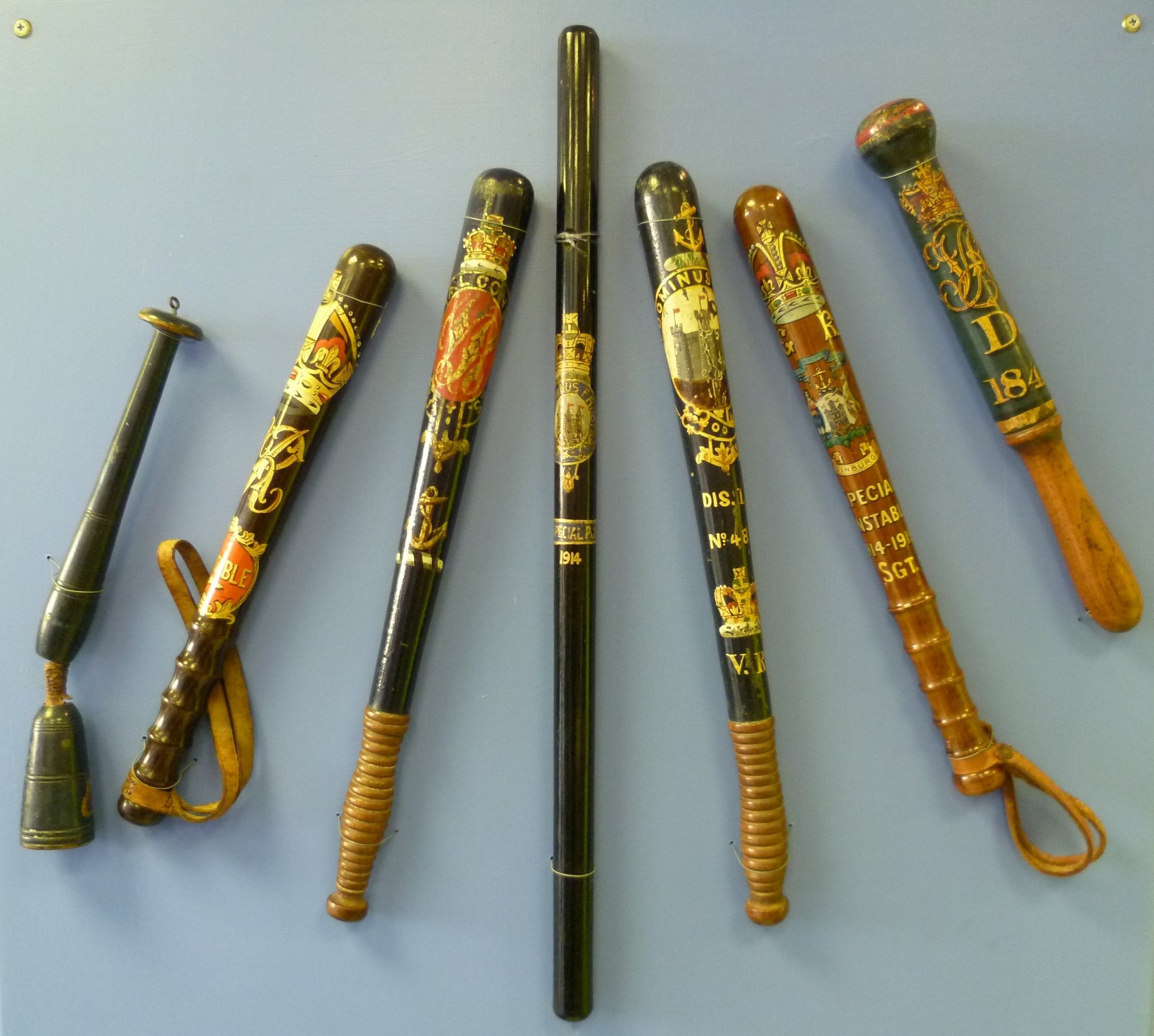
Early 20th century police truncheons (nightsticks) in the Edinburgh Police Centre Museum

The term "nightstick fracture" originated from the notion that a person hit by a police truncheon would hold their arms up to protect their heads from injury. Historically they were treated without surgery, but this resulted in a high risk of the broken parts not joining properly, unless the broken parts were generally aligned and the skin intact.
