= Reference.com =

Online encyclopedia

- Website type: Online encyclopedia; dictionary; thesaurus
- Available in: English; Spanish
- Owner: People Incorporated
- Website: www.reference.com
- Launched: February 1997; 29 years ago
- Current status: Discontinued

Reference.com was an online encyclopedia that organized content that used a question-and-answer format. Articles were organized into hierarchical categories.

Before IAC restructured the site following an acquisition in 2008, Reference.com also had comprised multiple reference works, and disclosed its sources.

Reference.com was discontinued along with the rest of IAC's search business on May 1, 2026.

== History ==
The old version of the Reference.com logo

Reference.com was launched by InReference, Inc in February 1997. The site was later acquired by Lexico Publishing Group, LLC. In 2005, Lexico announced that Reference.com would begin offering searches of Wikipedia content.

The popularity of Dictionary.com had been greatly boosted by Google's practice of offering a link at the top of their search results that goes to the Dictionary.com definition. This exclusive relationship was terminated without explanation to the public when the Google links were redirected to definitions at Answers.com. (In December 2009, the Answers.com links were replaced with Google's own dictionary.) Google added a Dictionary.com definition link for certain search words in a non-exclusive relationship (along with links to definitions from a few other commercial reference websites). On 3 July 2008, IAC acquired Lexico Publishing Group, LLC and its three properties: Thesaurus.com, Reference.com, and Dictionary.com.

== Sources ==
Reference.com reproduced content from external sources. The site's sources included other online dictionaries, encyclopedias, and a search of terms found on other websites such as Wikipedia and the CIA World Factbook. The site could also search Usenet groups and other mailing lists.

The encyclopedia had articles from such sources as the 2004 Columbia Electronic Encyclopedia, the Crystal Reference Encyclopedia, and later the English Wikipedia. Its online dictionary indexed the American Heritage Dictionary, Easton's 1897 Bible Dictionary, the Jargon File, the Kernerman English Multilingual Dictionary, Acronym Finder, Stedman's Medical Dictionary, Merriam-Webster's Medical Dictionary, the On-line Medical Dictionary, and WordNet. Its thesaurus was based on multiple versions of Roget's Thesaurus. The site's web directory was an interface to the Open Directory Project, and its web search feature used Google Search. An interface to Google Translate was added in 2008.

== User tracking ==
Reference.com in 2010 topped the list compiled by The Wall Street Journal ranking websites by how many third-party tracking cookies were added to the user's computer. Reference.com added 234 tracking cookies when encountering a first-time user.
