= Smith fracture =

A Smith fracture is a named vertebral fracture occurring most commonly in the lumbar spine. It is similar to that of a Chance fracture and is associated with seat belt injuries. This fracture represents a fracture through the posterior elements including the superior articular processes but not the spinous process, as well as an avulsion fracture of the vertebral body. It is not to be confused with the more commonly referred to Smith's fracture of the wrist.
