= Giovanni Battista Monteggia =

Italian surgeon (1762–1815)

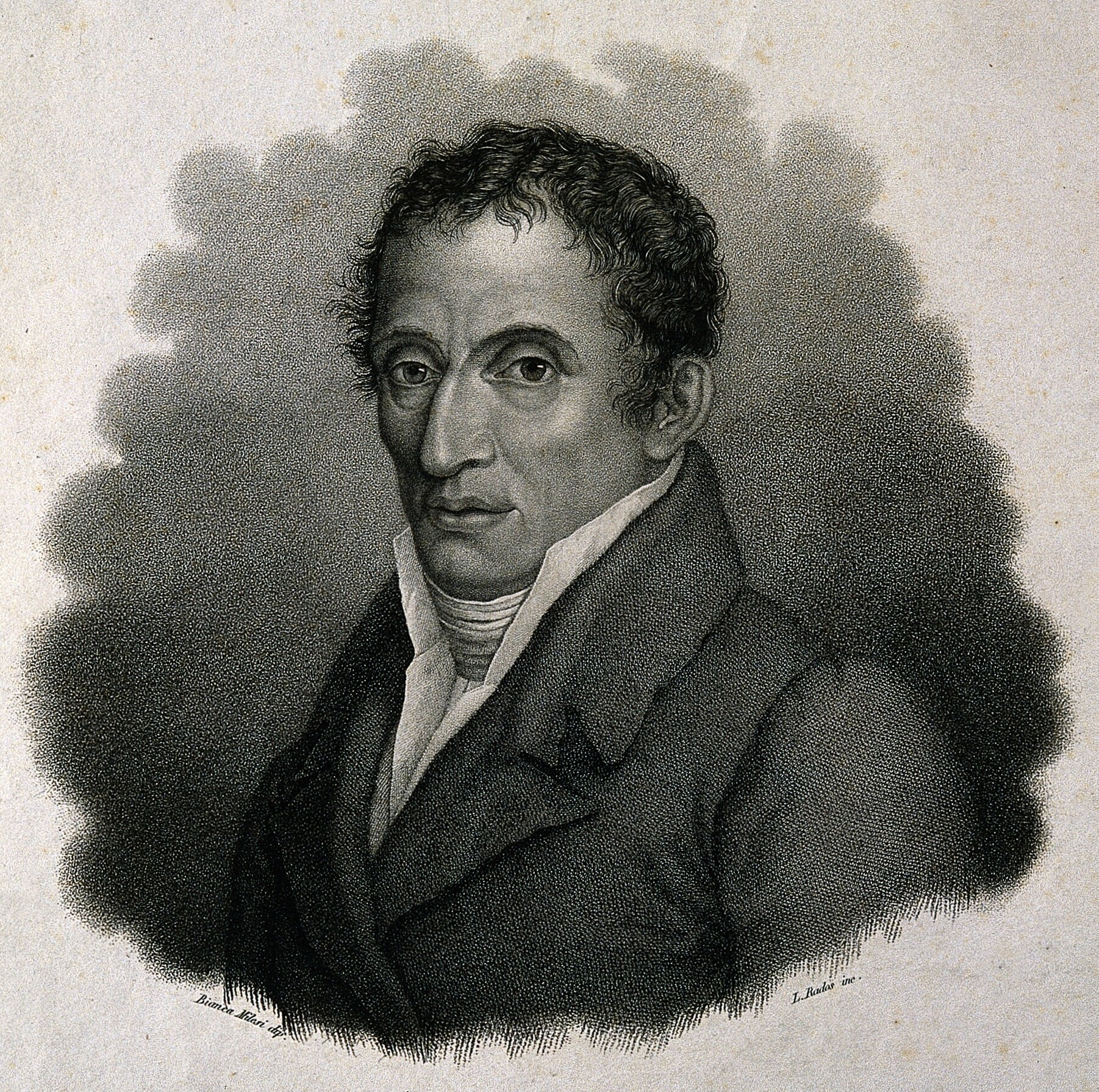
- Born: 8 August 1762; Laveno, Italy
- Died: 17 January 1815 (aged 52); Milan, Italy
- Years active: 1788-1815
- Known for: Monteggia fracture
- Medical career
- Profession: surgeon
- Field: surgery, traumatology

Giovanni Battista Monteggia (August 8, 1762 – January 17, 1815) was an Italian surgeon. The Monteggia fracture is named after him.

== Biography ==
=== Early life ===
Giovanni Battista Monteggia was born in Laveno, near the Lago Maggiore, northern Italy. His parents were Gian Antonio Monteggia and Marianna Vegezzi. Two brothers of his are known, one became a priest and the second a doctor. His father was occupied with the construction of infrastructures (mainly roads and aqueducts) and it was him who introduced Giovanni Battista, coming from a high school in Pallanza, to the field of medicine: Giovanni was admitted to the surgical school of the Ospedale Maggiore in Milan in 1779. His training was carried out on the background of the ideological and political conflicts of his time, between the revolutionary and the Napoleonic epoques. The figure of the surgeon-doctor identifies Monteggia.

=== Career ===
At the age of seventeen, he began training as a surgeon in Milan. In 1789, he was granted a doctorate of medicine from the University of Pavia. In the same year, his first book, Fasciculi Pathologici, was published. From 1790 he practiced as a surgical assistant, prosector, and prison doctor. In 1795 he was appointed professor of anatomy and surgery, holding the chair of Istituzioni Chirurgiche at the University of Pavia. He contracted syphilis after cutting himself during an autopsy.

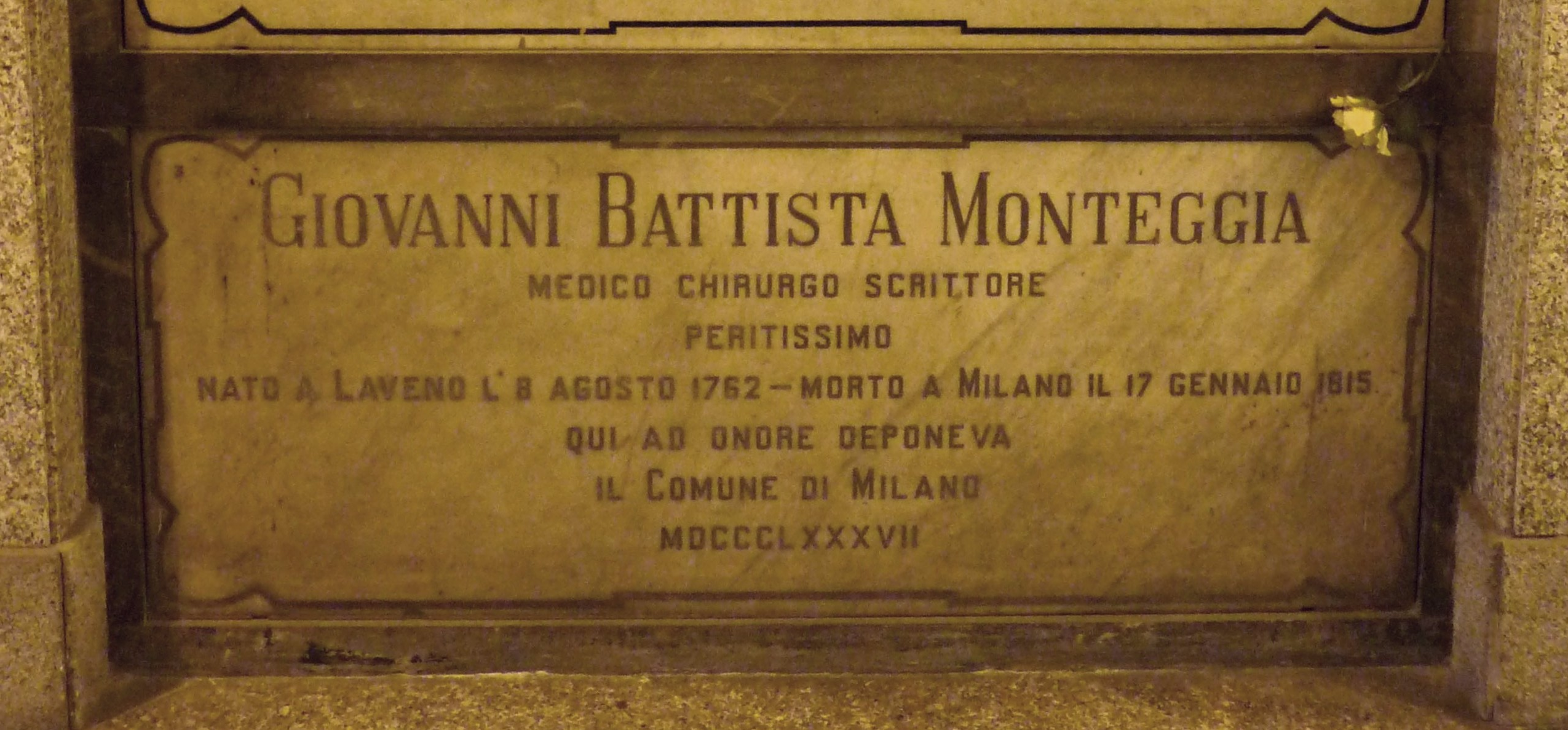
Monteggia's grave at the Monumental Cemetery of Milan, Italy

Monteggia was the second to describe the Monteggia fracture, a fracture of the proximal third of the ulna with dislocation of the head of the radius.

Monteggia was first to describe Peroneal Tendon Subluxation, when he diagnosed this injury in a ballet dancer in 1803. It is when you have subluxation/dislocation of the peroneal tendons about the lateral malleolus.

Monteggia started his studies in the anatomical field of medicine but was also interested in a wider biology: he practiced as a botanist and as a chemist under the supervision of Antonio Porati. On June 11, 1781, Monteggia did the exam of “libera pratica di chirurgia” at the University of Pavia, where afterwards was to degree in medicine. His surgical studies would determine his vision of medicine as mostly clinical. His first medical publication was written in latin and published in 1789 in Milan, named “Fasciculi Pathologici”. This booklet is dedicated to Carlo Maria Taverna, priest of San Nazaro and member of the committee in charge the administration of ecclesiastic places, that had been instituted in 1784 by Giuseppe II. Fasciculi Pathologici is a typical example of the anatomic-pathological culture derived by the teachings of Giovanni Battista Morgagni. Examination on the corpse and in particular of its wounds, follows the clinical observation. This booklet begins with a nosological classification of pathologies in symmetrical and asymmetrical. Secondly, the author proposes a classical theme of italian anatomical research: the injuries of the head, with some first observations on the constitution and the function of the brain. There is also a traditional description of different cases of abscess. Monteggia, together with this publication, donated to the Cabinet of Anatomy of the University of Pavia, his most interesting anatomical pieces. For this action he was thanked with a letter on December 18, 1793, by Johann Peter Frank. Also the Regal Magistrate thanked him with a dispatch that testifies the relationship with the principal scientific and medical institution in Lombardy. In the 1790, Monteggia became surgeon-helper and afterwards anatomical engraver at the Ospedale Maggiore (Milan). Thanks to the support of Taverna, he managed to have a slab. Likely this was not a personal initiative: in 1791 the medical director Bartolomeo de Battisti reestablished the teaching of anatomy, in the optic of reconstituting medical schools. The same year, on December 4, with a decree of the Court, Monteggia was nominated first surgeon of the Reign’s prisons. On January 20, 1792, the Hospital Congregation gave Monteggia the assignment of giving free lectures of surgery to young surgeons.

In 1792, Monteggia published the annotated translation of the "compendium on venereal illnesses" by the German author Johann Friedrich Fritze (original edition: Berlin 1790) in the printing house of Giuseppe Martelli. Later his own practical annotations on venereal diseases were published in 1794 at Giuseppe Galeazzi print shop. Dedicated to Moscati, the book displays a series of cases deriving from Monteggia’s direct clinical experience, being in contact with prostitutes and prisoners, and shows monteggia’s sensibility on the topic of ‘medical police’. The patients taken into account are mainly male. In this work Monteggia shows his interest and support towards the Brunonian system of medicine. He was later on blamed for this weak spot and his ideology and position faded away. John Brown (1735-1788) believed that the organism, subject to continuous stimuli from the environment, was based on an equilibrium between being excited and excitability. In his opinion most of the diseases required a treatment based on strong external stimuli. Monteggia, strongly supporting Brown's ideology, believed that venereal diseases could be cured by abstaining from intercourse: as a matter of fact in the Annotations Monteggia suggested to cure patients with aderivatives from the medicinal plant Sarsaparilla known for its stimulating effects. It was soon discovered that this system was not only useless in the aim of curing the disease, but it often caused a worsening of the patient’s conditions bringing to intensive care that, provoking interferences with the nervous system, caused death. With the advent of the Cisalpine Republic and subsequent Napoleonic era governments Monteggia life reached the peak of a short but fortunate career. He fulfilled several administrative roles, both of institutes he established within different hospitals, and of public and military committees (in 1808 he was called to examine the aspiring surgeons of the army).

His felicitous treatment of the prominent Francesco Melzi d’Eril cemented his prominence in the Napoleonic era governments. In 1795, Melzi d’Eril appointed Monteggia to an annuity and remained in contact with him all his life. On September 12, 1795, Monteggia was appointed professor of the institution of surgery at the Maggiore hospital, yet teaching began only one year later. In 1798 he was nominated as the official doctor-surgeon of the security guard of the legislative assembly. During the same year his position as a teacher in the Maggiore hospital was confirmed and one year later he became obstetric surgeon at the Pia casa delle partorienti di Santa Caterina alla Ruota. On April the second 1799, following an administrative order Monteggia became healthcare official for the prisons of the permanent army Council of the French army in Italy. He also was appointed for the inoculation of the smallpox vaccine. Nominated primary surgeon of the Maggiore hospital, he came back to ‘his’ hospital, where on January 30, 1800, he started lectures of surgery.

In 1796 Monteggia had published the translation from German of the Obstetric Art written by Georg Wilhelm Stein, yet leaving it without any commentary as he was very busy. He also published a series of obstetric cases, collected in a textbook for surgeons composed to accompany the lectures at the hospital. The work obtained numerous reprints in Milan, Naples and Pavia. The first edition, in five volumes, was published in Milan at Pirotta e Maspero, between 1802 and 1805. The second edition, in eight volumes, was revisited by Monteggia between 1803 and 1806 and published at Maspero and Boucher. The book was praised by various critics and reviewers. In particular Antonio Scarpa at the University of Pavia, who hoped to recruit Monteggia as professor of clinical surgery after him. Monteggia had also prepared a translation of his work into Latin in order to make it accessible to an international audience.

Monteggia had broader ambitions for the second edition. In addition to the Brunonian theories, Monteggia takes up, with many reservations, the doctrine of the 'controstimolo' by Giovanni Rasori, of which he attempts an application in the surgical field, although, as we read in the Preface to the second edition of the work, he is not fully convinced. His main source of inspiration is the work of the Scottish surgeon John Hunter, but he knows and uses contemporary scientific literature, and in particular periodical publications. In fact, it proves to be a clinician attentive to practice the systemization, with a specific sensitivity to pharmacology. In addition to the usual surgical arguments, he is among the first to accurately describe polio from a clinical point of view. But his focus is particularly on orthopaedics. In particular, it provides valuable descriptive contributions to the pathology of the locomotor apparatus especially for the part concerning traumatology. Before others, he studies and describes the vices of gait (lameness) that he calls "dilombamento o sfiancamento". It makes the technique of dressing wounds and sores easier and perfects the devices in use to treat fractures and sprains. He divides dislocations into perfect and imperfect (subluxations). He ties his name to the eponymous fracture and hip mooning. The first with a description of the fracture of the ulna's 1st of the fin associated with the anterior dislocation of the radio capital. The second is due to the dislocation of the head of the femur near the anterior-upper illiac spine. Monteggia is always intent on learning from corpses the weaving of the body and to reveal from the bowels the hidden secrets of diseases. He always writes down observations of clinical signs at the bedside of patients; in reading his memoirs there are also faithfully recorded the wrong care and, even the diagnostic errors that happened to him in the long exercise of the profession, in which, who is most worth it, the less mistakes he makes; as Hippocrates himself claimed. Monteggia died before completing his work, of which he had designed a ninth volume dedicated among other things to electricity, vaccination, and a systematic treatment of the surgical pharmacopoeia. In 1813 he became a member of the reborn Institute of Sciences, Letterature and Arts in Milan. He was himself a contributor to the Journal of the most recent medical literature in Europe and to the New Journal of Medicine and Surgery in Milan. He collected a rich library.

=== Late life ===
Monteggia is working on the latest edition of the "Surgical Institutions" when it is struck by night fevers that, however, do not distract him from his work and from the care of the sick; he is suffering from erysipelas that spreads from his right ear to the whole face and, despite the care of his colleagues, dies on the night of January 17, 1815 and he finds burial at the cemetery of Porta Romana; his remains, already unearthed, are exhumed again at the demolition of the cemetery and renowned at the Monumental Cemetery of Milan on April 27, 1875. A monument was erected in the atrium of the Maggiore hospital, now lost, which inspired, among other things, a sonnet to Carlo Porta. A bust of Canovian style was saved, due to the sculptor Camillo Pacetti. The Policlinic of Milan, as a gesture of solemn respect towards Monteggia, dedicated to him the Pavilion of Surgery in 1929.

== Bibliography ==
- E. Acerbi, Della vita e degli studii di G. B. Monteggia, Milano 1816;
- L. Agrifoglio, La etiopatogenesi delle malattie celtiche in alcune note di G.B. Monteggia, in Castalia, XII (1954);
- G. Cosmacini, Biografia della Ca’ Granda. Uomini e idee dell’Ospedale Maggiore di Milano, Roma-Bari 2001;
- E. De Tipaldo, Biografia degli Italiani illustri, V, Venezia 1837;
- G. Frank, Memorie, a cura di G. Galli, I, Milano 2006;
- F. Fusi, Biografia di Giovanni Battista Monteggia, in Rivista di Ortopedia e traumatologia, XXIV (1956);
- La Ca’ Granda: cinque secoli di storia e d’arte dell’Ospedale Maggiore di Milano (catal.), Milano 1981;
- P. Sangiorgio, Cenni storici sulle due università di Pavia e di Milano e notizie intorno ai più celebri medici, Milano 1831;
- A. Scarpa, Epistolario (1772-1832), a cura di G. Sala, Pavia 1938.
