= Léon Gosselin =

French surgeon (1815–1887)

Léon Athanase Gosselin
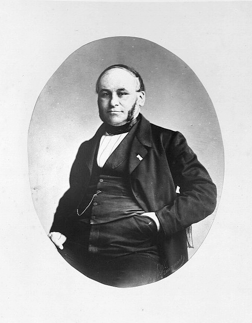
- Léon Athanase Gosselin (photo circa 1850/1860)
- Born: 16 January 1815
- Died: 30 April 1887 (aged 72)
- Medical career
- Institutions: Hôpital de la Charité

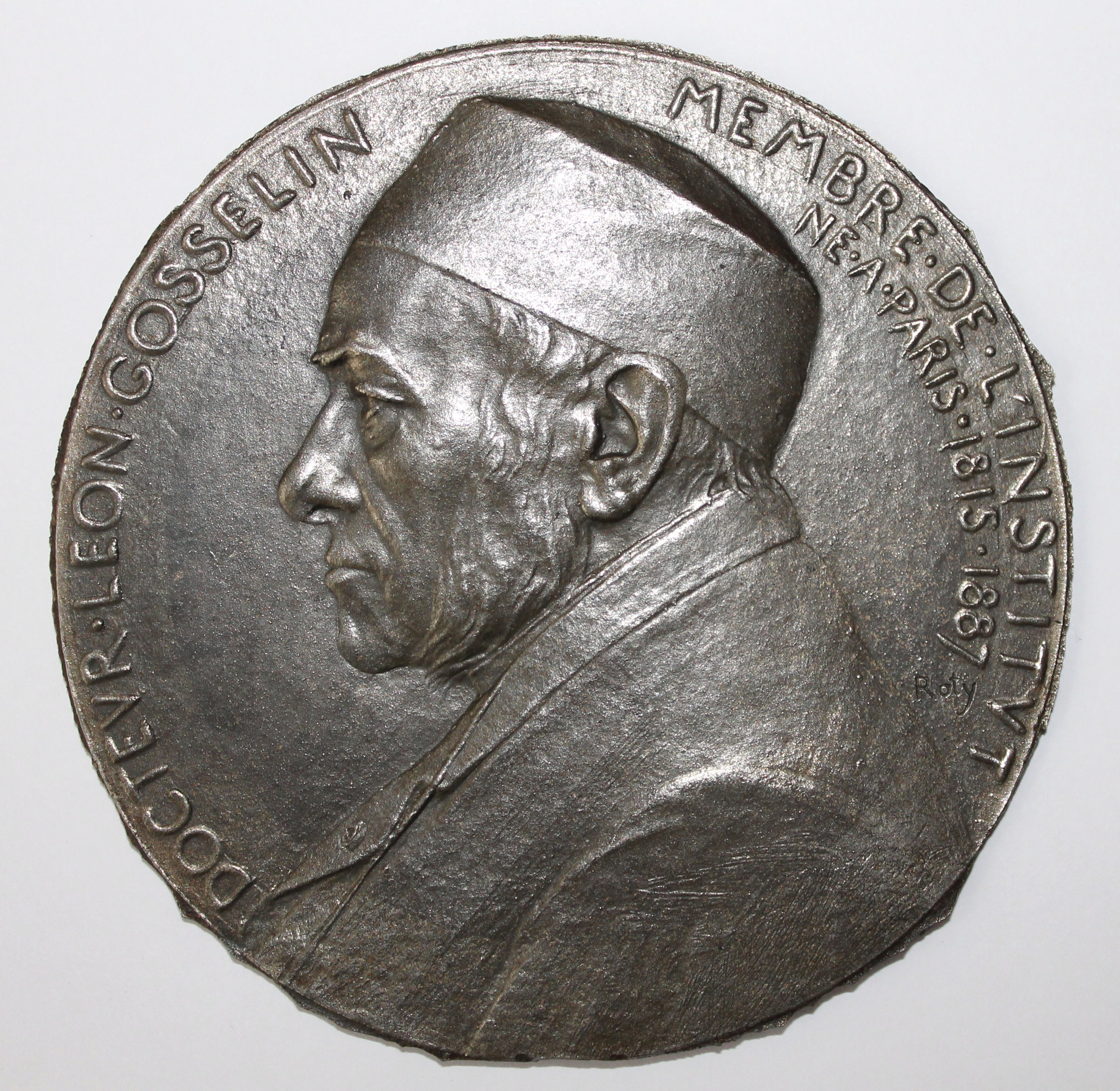
Léon Gosselin medal by Louis-Oscar Roty

Léon Athanase Gosselin (16 January 1815, in Paris – 30 April 1887) was a French surgeon remembered for describing the Gosselin fracture in 1866. He was chief of surgery at the Hôpital de la Charité in Paris.

He studied medicine in Paris, becoming a prosector to the medical faculty in 1842. In 1843 he defended his doctorate with a thesis titled "Études sur les fibro-cartilages inter-articulaires". During the following year he attained his aggregation in surgery with the thesis "De l’étranglement dans les hernies". He was appointed professor at the Faculté de Médecine de Paris — the first chair of external pathology (1858–1866), the fourth chair of clinical surgery at Pitié Hospital (1867), the third chair of clinical surgery at the Charité (1867–1884). He was also a professor at the École supérieure de Pharmacie.

During his career, Gosselin excelled in the fields of orthopedics, anatomy, physiology and urology. He is remembered for his research on diseases of the testicles, spermatic cord and scrotum, and their effect on fertility and virility. In this regard he is considered a pioneer of andrology.

== Written works ==
- 1857: Traité pratique des maladies du testicule.
- 1859: De l'irréductibilité et des déformations consécutives dans les fractures des os longs.
- 1867: Mémoire sur les tumeurs cirsoïdes artérielles chez les adolescents et les adultes.
- 1875: Sur les faux abcès des os longs et l'ostéite à forme névralgique qui les accompagne ou les simule, lu à l'Académie de médecine, le 5 octobre 1875.
- 1879: Clinique chirurgicale de l'hôpital de la Charité.
- 1881: Recherches sur la valeur antiseptique de certaines substances et en particulier de la solution alcoolique de Gaultheria.
- 1883: Traité des maladies du rectum.
