= Seat belt syndrome =

Injury associated with seat belt use

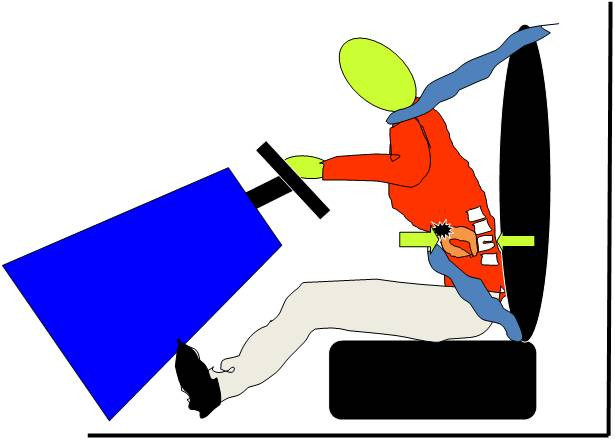
Seatbelt syndrome is defined as a seatbelt sign associated with lumbar spine fracture and bowel perforation.

Seat belt syndrome is a collective term that includes all injury profiles associated with the use of seat belts. It is defined classically as a seat belt sign (seat belt marks on the body) plus an intra-abdominal organ injury (e.g. bowel perforations) and/or thoraco-lumbar vertebral fractures. The seat-belt sign was originally described by Garrett and Braunstein in 1962 as linear ecchymosis of the abdominal wall following a motor vehicle accident. It is indicative of an internal injury in as many as 30% of cases seen in the emergency department. Disruption of the abdominal wall musculature can also occur but is relatively uncommon.

Apart from the medical aspects of injury, there are legal issues associated with seat belt injuries. If a person's seat belt fails, and this can be proved, then they may be entitled to compensation; however, it may be argued that the seat belt was not worn as intended or designed, rendering any legal claims invalid.

== Symptoms ==
Clinical presentation varies according to the organ injured. In hollow-viscus injuries, patients may develop signs of peritoneal irritation, such as abdominal tenderness, guarding, or rebound. In contrast, injuries to solid organs or major vessels more commonly produce features of hypovolemia, including tachycardia, hypotension, and signs of circulatory instability.

== Pathogenesis ==
Seat belt syndrome is caused by hyperflexion of the spine around the lap strap in sudden deceleration leading to crushing of intra-abdominal contents between the spine and the seatbelt. Fixed portions of the bowel such as proximal jejunum and distal ileum are more susceptible to injury than mobile portions since mobile segments can escape the high pressure and resultant damage.
