= Peter Essex-Lopresti =

British orthopaedic surgeon

Peter Gordon Lawrence Essex-Lopresti FRCS Ed. (1916 – 13 June 1951) was a British orthopaedic surgeon remembered for describing the Essex-Lopresti fracture and for his work on classification and treatment of fractures of the calcaneus.

== Biography ==
Peter Essex-Lopresti trained at the London Hospital, qualifying in 1937. He joined the Royal Army Medical Corps, serving as surgical specialist in an airborne division during World War II. He published a report on the injuries sustained during over 20,000 parachute jumps made by the Sixth British Airborne Division, and followed this with a paper on the open wound in trauma.

After the war he worked as a consultant surgeon at the Birmingham Accident Hospital, where he reorganized the postgraduate training program. He was awarded a Hunterian Professorship in 1951; his Hunterian Lecture, given on 6 March 1951, was "The Mechanism, Reduction Technique, and Results in Fractures of Os Calcis."

He died suddenly at home at the age of 35, leaving a wife and two children.
