= The Free Dictionary =

American online dictionary and encyclopedia

- Screenshot
- Website type: Online dictionary, encyclopedia
- Available in: English, Spanish, German, French, Italian, Chinese, Portuguese, Dutch, Norwegian, Greek, Arabic, Polish, Turkish, Russian
- Owners: Farlex, Inc.
- Website: thefreedictionary.com
- Registration: Optional
- Launched: June 5, 2003; 23 years ago
- Current status: Active

The Free Dictionary is an American online dictionary and encyclopedia that aggregates information from various sources. It is accessible in fourteen languages.

== History ==
The Free Dictionary was launched in 2005 by Farlex. In the same year, it was included in PCMag's Make Your Browser Better list.

== Content ==
The site cross-references the contents of dictionaries such as The American Heritage Dictionary of the English Language, the Collins English Dictionary; encyclopedias such as the Columbia Encyclopedia, the Computer Desktop Encyclopedia, the Hutchinson Encyclopedia (subscription), and Wikipedia; book publishers such as McGraw-Hill, Houghton Mifflin, HarperCollins, as well as the Acronym Finder database, several financial dictionaries, legal dictionaries, and other content.

It has a feature that allows a user to preview an article while positioning the mouse cursor over a link. One can also click on any word to look it up in the dictionary. The website has sections such as Spelling Bee, Word Pronunciation, My Word List, and Match Up.

It is available as a mobile app called "Dictionary app by Farlex".

== Farlex ==
The site is run by Farlex, Inc., located in Huntingdon Valley, Pennsylvania.

Farlex also maintains a companion title, The Free Library, an online library of out-of-copyright classic books as well as a collection of periodicals of over four million articles dating back to 1984, and definition-of.com, a community dictionary of slang and other terms.

=== The Free Library ===
The Free Library has a separate homepage. It is a free reference website that offers full-text versions of classic literary works by hundreds of authors. It is also a news aggregator, offering articles from a large collection of periodicals containing over four million articles dating back to 1984. Newly published articles are added to the site daily. The site comprises a selection of articles from open-access journals that can in many cases also be found on a journal's own website.

It is a sister site to The Free Dictionary and usage examples in the form of "references in classic literature" taken from the site's collection are used on The Free Dictionary's definition pages. In addition, double-clicking on a word in the site's collection of reference materials brings up the word's definition on The Free Dictionary.

== See also ==
- List of online dictionaries
- List of online encyclopedias
