= Monteggia fracture =

Monteggia fracture-dislocation
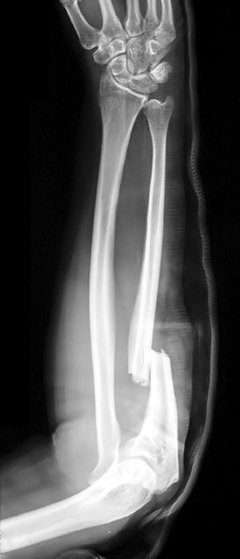
- X-ray of Monteggia fracture of right forearm
- Specialty: Orthopedic surgery, orthopedic surgery

The Monteggia fracture is a fracture of the proximal third of the ulna with dislocation of the proximal head of the radius. It is named after Giovanni Battista Monteggia.

== Causes ==
Mechanisms include:

- Fall outstretched hand with the forearm in excessive pronation (hyper-pronation injury). The ulna fractures in the proximal one-third of the shaft due to extreme dislocation. Depending on the impact and forces applied in each direction, degree of energy absorption determines pattern, involvement of the radial head and whether or not open soft tissue occurs.
- Direct blow on back of upper forearm would be a very uncommon cause. In this context, isolated ulnar shaft fractures are most commonly seen in defence against blunt trauma (e.g. nightstick injury). Such an isolated ulnar shaft fracture is not a Monteggia fracture. It is called a 'nightstick fracture'.

== Diagnosis ==
=== Classification ===
There are four types (depending upon displacement of the radial head):

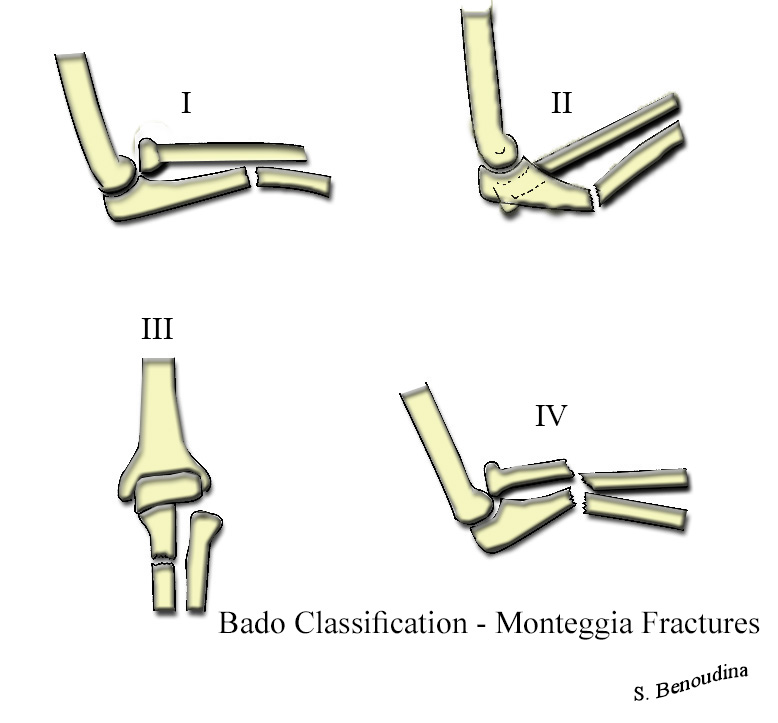
Bado Classification - Monteggia Fractures

- I - Extension type (60%) - ulna shaft angulates anteriorly (extends) and radial head dislocates anteriorly.
- II - Flexion type (15%) - ulna shaft angulates posteriorly (flexes) and radial head dislocates posteriorly.
- III - Lateral type (20%) - ulna shaft angulates laterally (bent to outside) and radial head dislocates to the side.
- IV - Combined type (5%) - ulna shaft and radial shaft are both fractured and radial head is dislocated, typically anteriorly.

These are known as the Bado types.

== Management ==
Monteggia fractures may be managed conservatively in children with closed reduction (resetting and casting), but due to high risk of displacement causing malunion, open reduction internal fixation is typically performed.

Osteosynthesis (open reduction and internal fixation) of the ulnar shaft is considered the standard of care in adults. It promotes stability of the radial head dislocation and allows very early mobilisation to prevent stiffness. The elbow joint is particularly susceptible to loss of motion.

== Prognosis ==
In children, the results of early treatment are always good, typically normal or nearly so. If diagnosis is delayed, reconstructive surgery is needed and complications are much more common and results poorer. In adults, the healing is slower and results usually not as good.

Complications of ORIF surgery for Monteggia fractures can include non-union, malunion, nerve palsy and damage, muscle damage, arthritis, tendonitis, infection, stiffness and loss of range of motion, compartment syndrome, audible popping or snapping, deformity, and chronic pain associated with surgical hardware such as pins, screws, and plates. Several surgeries may be needed to correct this type of fracture as it is almost always a very complex fracture that requires a skilled orthopedic surgeon, usually a specialist familiar with this type of injury.

== See also ==
- Galeazzi fracture
- Hume fracture
- Essex-Lopresti fracture
