= Gosselin fracture =

Fracture of the distal tibia

The Gosselin fracture is a V-shaped fracture of the distal tibia which extends into the ankle joint and fractures the tibial plafond into anterior and posterior fragments.

The fracture was described by Leon Athanese Gosselin, chief of surgery at the Hôpital de la Charité in Paris.
