= Ulna =

Medial bone from forearm

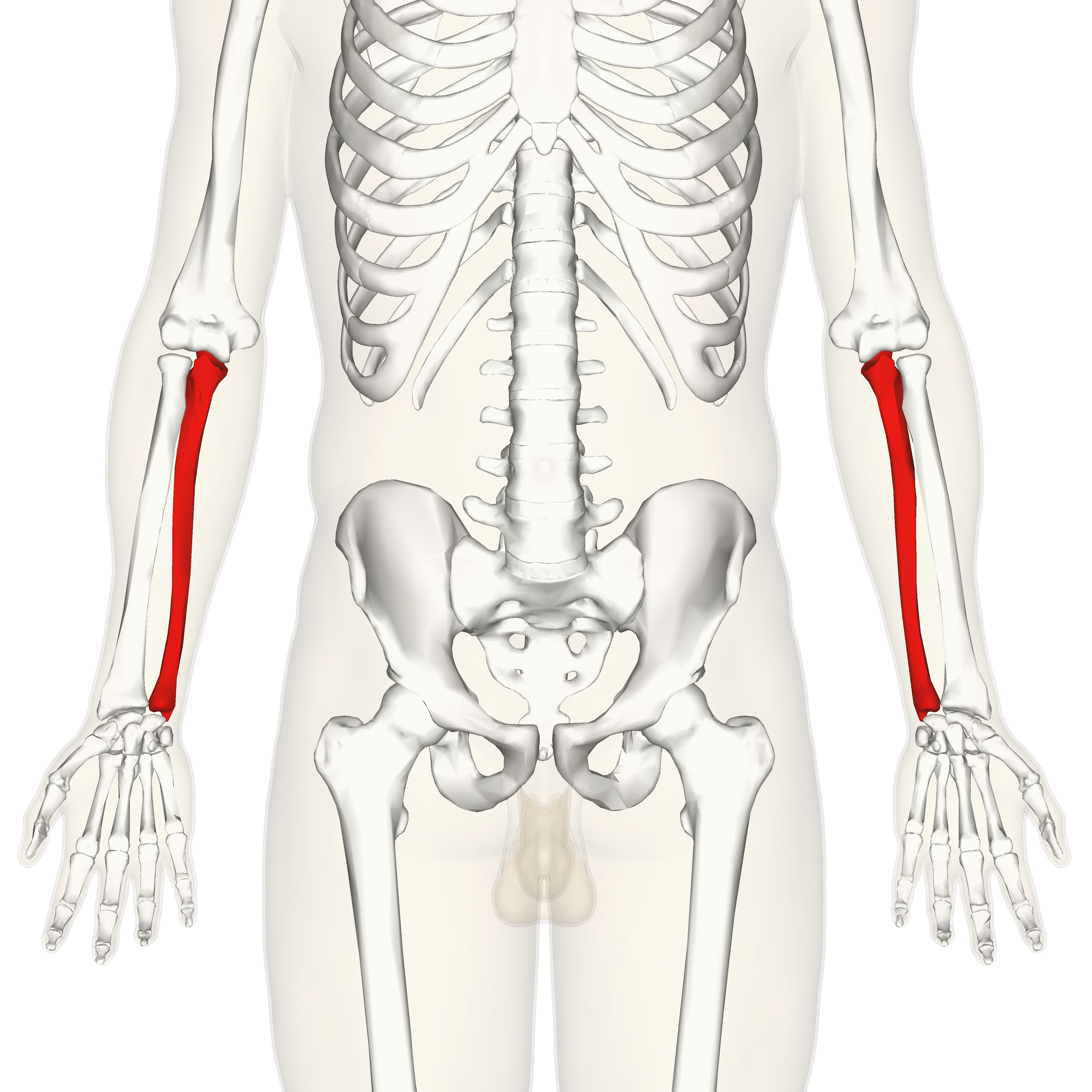
- An example of a human ulna, shown in red (in standard anatomical position).

Details
- Pronunciation: /ˈʌlnə/

Identifiers
- Latin: ulna
- MeSH: D014457
- TA98: A02.4.06.001
- TA2: 1230
- FMA: 23466

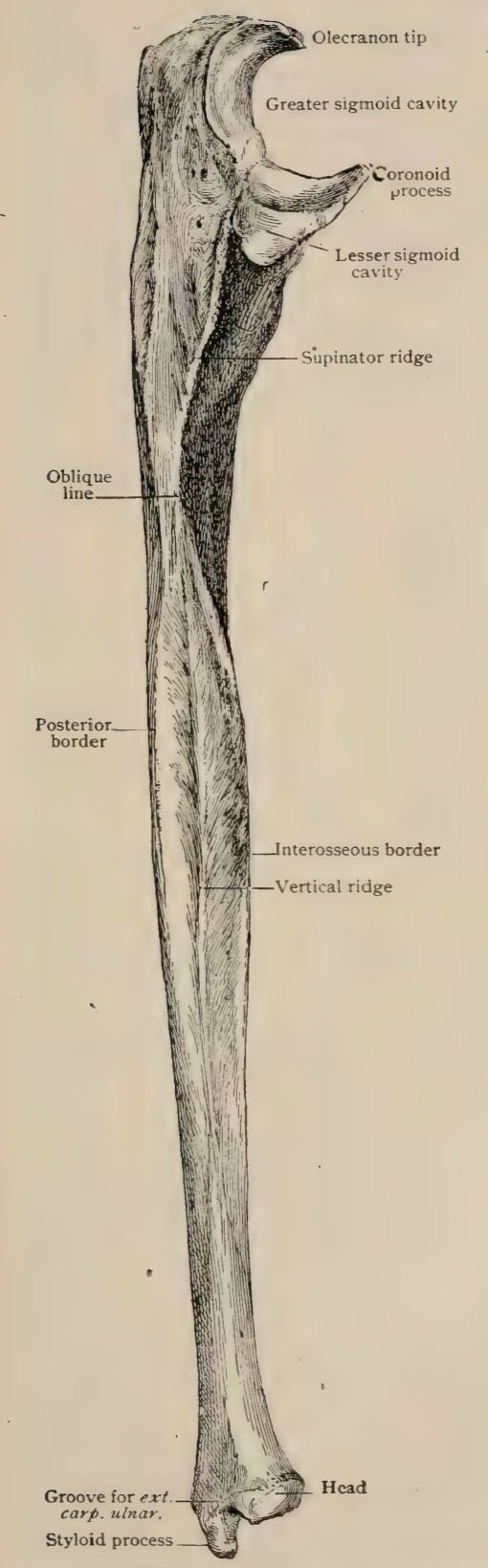
Right ulna, lateral aspect. (After Piersol.)

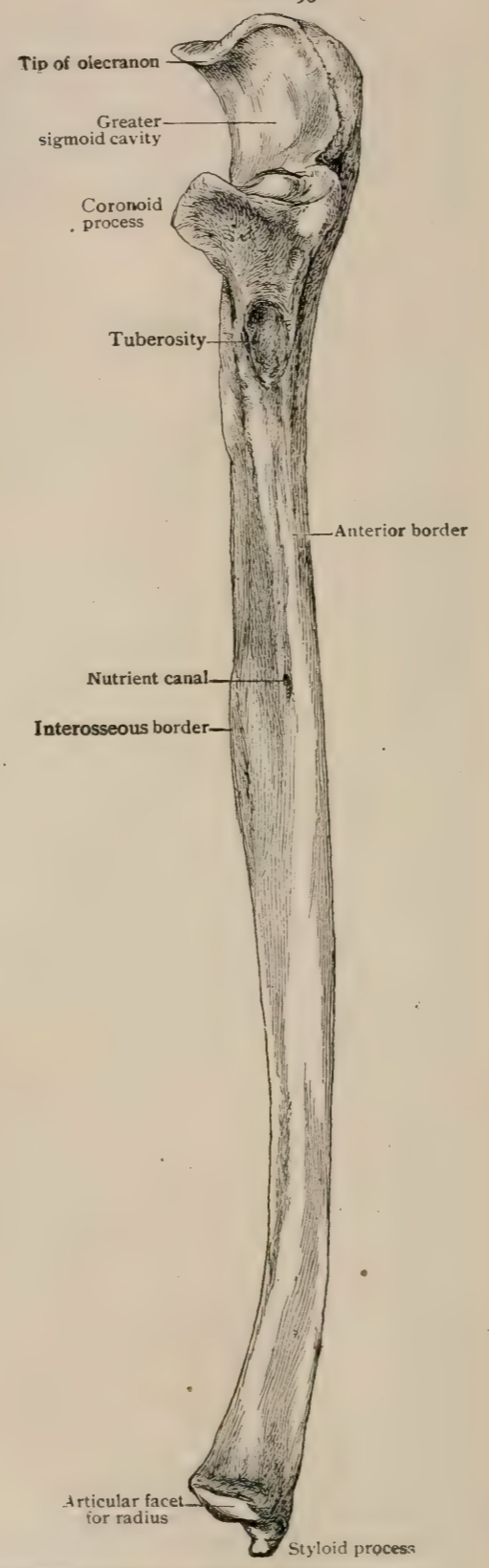
Right ulnar bone, medial aspect. (After Piersol.)

The ulna or ulnar bone (pl.: ulnae or ulnas) is a long bone in the forearm stretching from the elbow to the wrist. It is on the same side of the forearm as the little finger, running parallel to the radius, the forearm's other long bone. Longer and thinner than the radius, the ulna is considered to be the smaller long bone of the lower arm. The corresponding bone in the lower leg is the fibula.

== Structure ==
The ulna is a long bone found in the forearm that stretches from the elbow to the wrist, and when in standard anatomical position, is found on the medial side of the forearm. It is broader close to the elbow, and narrows as it approaches the wrist.

Close to the elbow, the ulna has a bony process, the olecranon process, a hook-like structure that fits into the olecranon fossa of the humerus. This prevents hyperextension and forms a hinge joint with the trochlea of the humerus. There is also a radial notch for the head of the radius, and the ulnar tuberosity to which muscles attach.

Close to the wrist, the ulna has a styloid process.

=== Near the elbow ===
Near the elbow, the ulna has two curved processes, the olecranon and the coronoid process; and two concave, articular cavities, the semilunar and radial notches.

The olecranon is a large, thick, curved eminence, situated at the upper and back part of the ulna. It is bent forward at the summit so as to present a prominent lip which is received into the olecranon fossa of the humerus in extension of the forearm. Its base is contracted where it joins the body and the narrowest part of the upper end of the ulna. Its posterior surface, directed backward, is triangular, smooth, subcutaneous, and covered by a bursa. Its superior surface is of quadrilateral form, marked behind by a rough impression for the insertion of the triceps brachii; and in front, near the margin, by a slight transverse groove for the attachment of part of the posterior ligament of the elbow joint. Its anterior surface is smooth, concave, and forms the upper part of the semilunar notch. Its borders present continuations of the groove on the margin of the superior surface; they serve for the attachment of ligaments: the back part of the ulnar collateral ligament medially, and the posterior ligament laterally. From the medial border a part of the flexor carpi ulnaris arises; while to the lateral border the anconeus is attached.

The coronoid process is a triangular eminence projecting forward from the upper and front part of the ulna. Its base is continuous with the body of the bone, and of considerable strength. Its apex is pointed, slightly curved upward, and in flexion of the forearm is received into the coronoid fossa of the humerus. Its upper surface is smooth, concave, and forms the lower part of the semilunar notch. Its antero-inferior surface is concave, and marked by a rough impression for the insertion of the brachialis. At the junction of this surface with the front of the body is a rough eminence, the tuberosity of the ulna, which gives insertion to a part of the brachialis; to the lateral border of this tuberosity the oblique cord is attached. Its lateral surface presents a narrow, oblong, articular depression, the radial notch. Its medial surface, by its prominent, free margin, serves for the attachment of part of the ulnar collateral ligament. At the front part of this surface is a small rounded eminence for the origin of one head of the flexor digitorum superficialis; behind the eminence is a depression for part of the origin of the flexor digitorum profundus; descending from the eminence is a ridge which gives origin to one head of the pronator teres. Frequently, the flexor pollicis longus arises from the lower part of the coronoid process by a rounded bundle of muscular fibers.

The semilunar notch is a large depression, formed by the olecranon and the coronoid process, and serving as articulation with the trochlea of the humerus. About the middle of either side of this notch is an indentation, which contracts it somewhat, and indicates the junction of the olecranon and the coronoid process. The notch is concave from above downward, and divided into a medial and a lateral portion by a smooth ridge running from the summit of the olecranon to the tip of the coronoid process. The medial portion is the larger, and is slightly concave transversely; the lateral is convex above, slightly concave below.

The radial notch is a narrow, oblong, articular depression on the lateral side of the coronoid process; it receives the circumferential articular surface of the head of the radius. It is concave from before backward, and its prominent extremities serve for the attachment of the annular ligament.

=== Body ===
The body of the ulna at its upper part is prismatic in form, and curved so as to be convex behind and lateralward; its central part is straight; its lower part is rounded, smooth, and bent a little lateralward. It tapers gradually from above downward, and has three borders and three surfaces.

Borders

- The volar border (margo volaris; anterior border) begins above at the prominent medial angle of the coronoid process, and ends below in front of the styloid process. Its upper part, well-defined, and its middle portion, smooth and rounded, give origin to the flexor digitorum profundus; its lower fourth serves for the origin of the pronator quadratus. This border separates the volar from the medial surface.
- The dorsal border (margo dorsalis; posterior border) begins above at the apex of the triangular subcutaneous surface at the back part of the olecranon, and ends below at the back of the styloid process; it is well-marked in the upper three-fourths, and gives attachment to an aponeurosis which affords a common origin to the flexor carpi ulnaris, the extensor carpi ulnaris, and the flexor digitorum profundus; its lower fourth is smooth and rounded. This border separates the medial from the dorsal surface.
- The interosseous crest (crista interossea; external or interosseous border) begins above by the union of two lines, which converge from the extremities of the radial notch and enclose between them a triangular space for the origin of part of the supinator; it ends below at the head of the ulna. Its upper part is sharp, its lower fourth smooth and rounded. This crest gives attachment to the interosseous membrane, and separates the volar from the dorsal surface.

Surfaces

- The volar surface (facies volaris; anterior surface), much broader above than below, is concave in its upper three-fourths, and gives origin to the flexor digitorum profundus; its lower fourth, also concave, is covered by the pronator quadratus. The lower fourth is separated from the remaining portion by a ridge, directed obliquely downward and medialward, which marks the extent of origin of the pronator quadratus. At the junction of the upper with the middle third of the bone is the nutrient canal, directed obliquely upward.
- The dorsal surface (facies dorsalis; posterior surface) directed backward and lateralward, is broad and concave above; convex and somewhat narrower in the middle; narrow, smooth, and rounded below. On its upper part is an oblique ridge, which runs from the dorsal end of the radial notch, downward to the dorsal border; the triangular surface above this ridge receives the insertion of the anconeus, while the upper part of the ridge affords attachment to the supinator. Below this the surface is subdivided by a longitudinal ridge, sometimes called the perpendicular line, into two parts: the medial part is smooth, and covered by the extensor carpi ulnaris; the lateral portion, wider and rougher, gives origin from above downward to the supinator, the abductor pollicis longus, the extensor pollicis longus, and the extensor indicis proprius.
- The medial surface (facies medialis; internal surface) is broad and concave above, narrow and convex below. Its upper three-fourths give origin to the flexor digitorum profundus; its lower fourth is subcutaneous.

=== Near the wrist ===
Near the wrist, the ulnar, with two eminences; the lateral and larger is a rounded, articular eminence, termed the head of the ulna; the medial, narrower and more projecting, is a non-articular eminence, the ulnar styloid process.

- The head of the ulna presents an articular surface, part of which, of an oval or semilunar form, is directed downward, and articulates with the upper surface of the triangular articular disk which separates it from the wrist-joint; the remaining portion, directed lateralward, is narrow, convex, and received into the ulnar notch of the radius.
- The styloid process projects from the medial and back part of the bone; it descends a little lower than the head, and its rounded end affords attachment to the ulnar collateral ligament of the wrist-joint.

The head is separated from the styloid process by a depression for the attachment of the apex of the triangular articular disk, and behind, by a shallow groove for the tendon of the extensor carpi ulnaris.

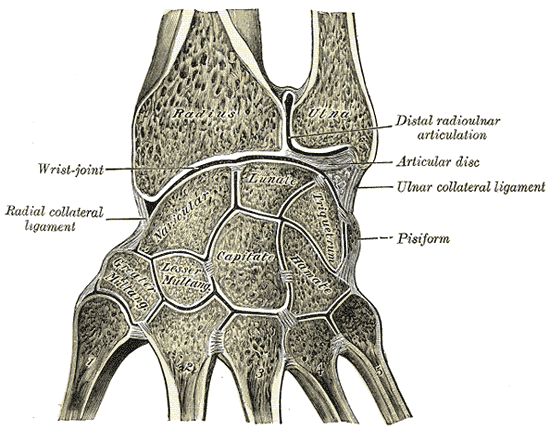
Vertical section through the articulations at the wrist, showing the synovial cavities.

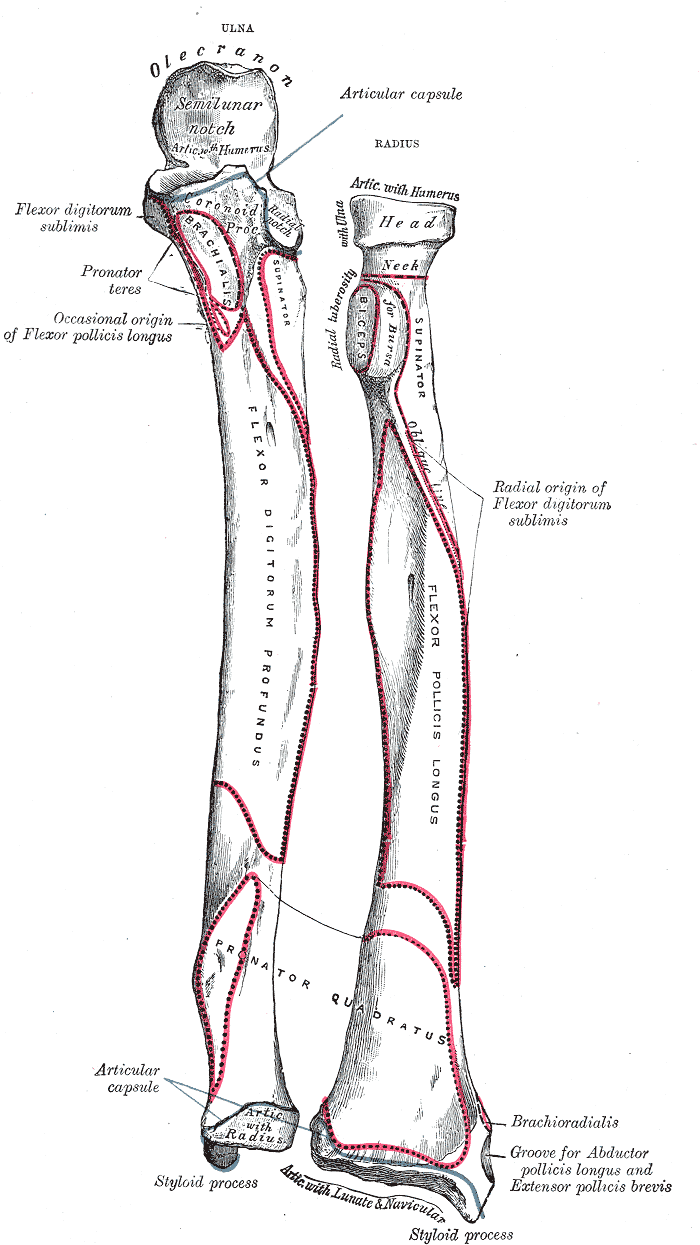
Bones of left forearm. Anterior aspect.

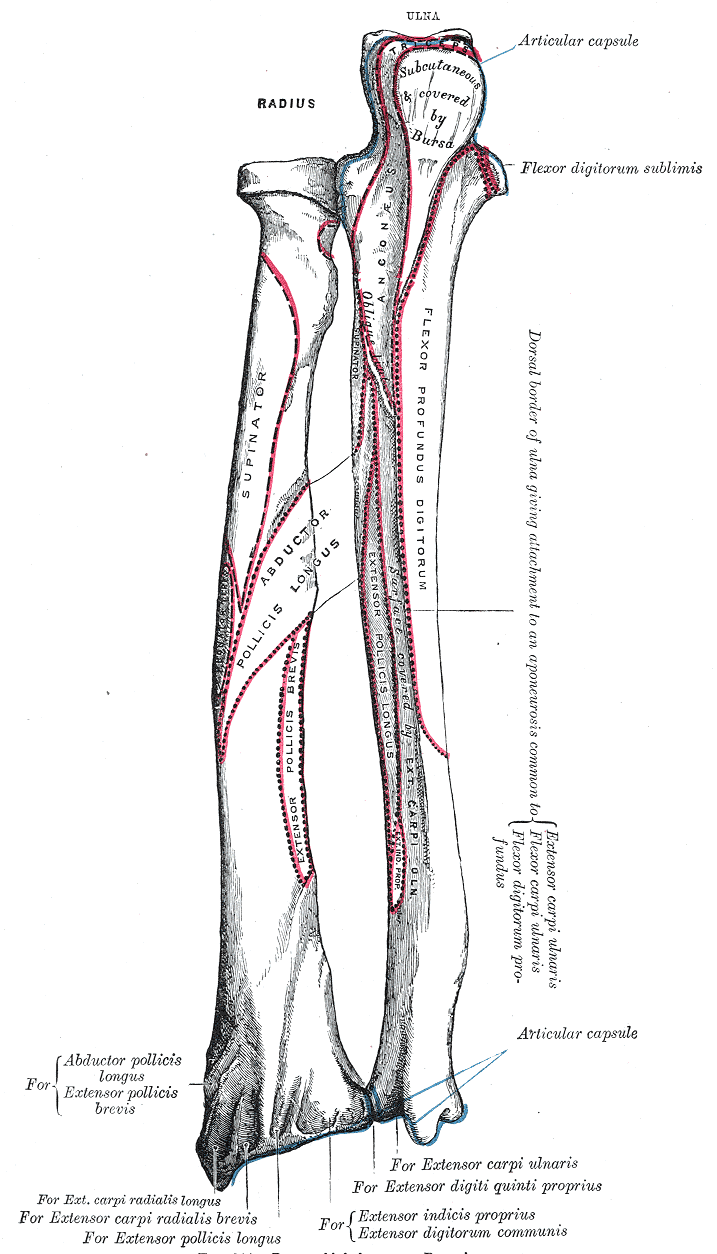
Bones of left forearm. Posterior aspect.

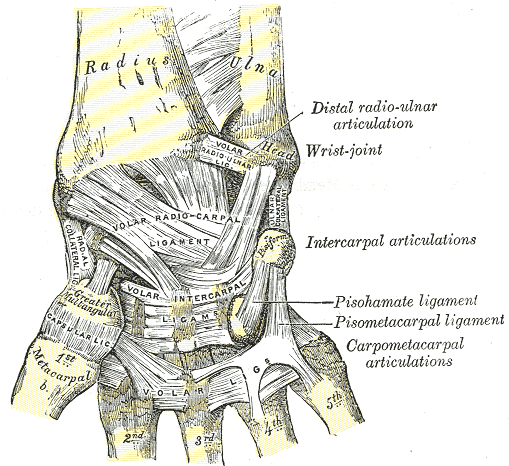
Ligaments of wrist. Anterior view

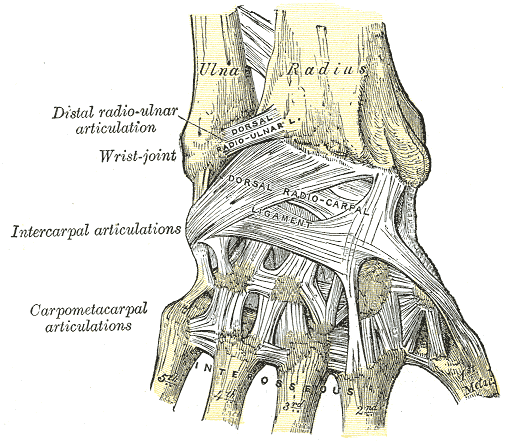
Ligaments of wrist. Posterior view.

=== Microanatomy ===
The ulna is a long bone. The long, narrow medullary cavity of the ulna is enclosed in a strong wall of cortical tissue which is thickest along the interosseous border and dorsal surface. At the extremities the compact layer thins. The compact layer is continued onto the back of the olecranon as a plate of close spongy bone with lamellae parallel. From the inner surface of this plate and the compact layer below it trabeculae arch forward toward the olecranon and coronoid and cross other trabeculae, passing backward over the medullary cavity from the upper part of the shaft below the coronoid. Below the coronoid process there is a small area of compact bone from which trabeculae curve upward to end obliquely to the surface of the semilunar notch which is coated with a thin layer of compact bone. The trabeculae at the lower end have a more longitudinal direction.

=== Development ===
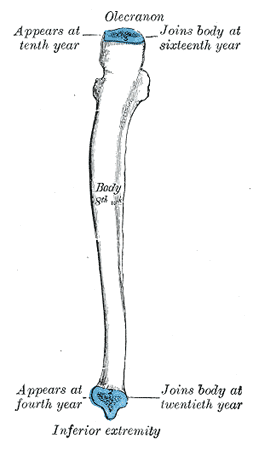
The ulna is formed into bone from three centre

The ulna is ossified from three centers: one each for the body, the wrist end, and the elbow end, near the top of the olecranon. Ossification begins near the middle of the body of the ulna, about the eighth week of fetal life, and soon extends through the greater part of the bone.

At birth, the ends are cartilaginous. About the fourth year or so, a center appears in the middle of the head, and soon extends into the ulnar styloid process. About the tenth year, a center appears in the olecranon near its extremity, the chief part of this process being formed by an upward extension of the body. The upper epiphysis joins the body about the sixteenth, the lower about the twentieth year.

== Function ==
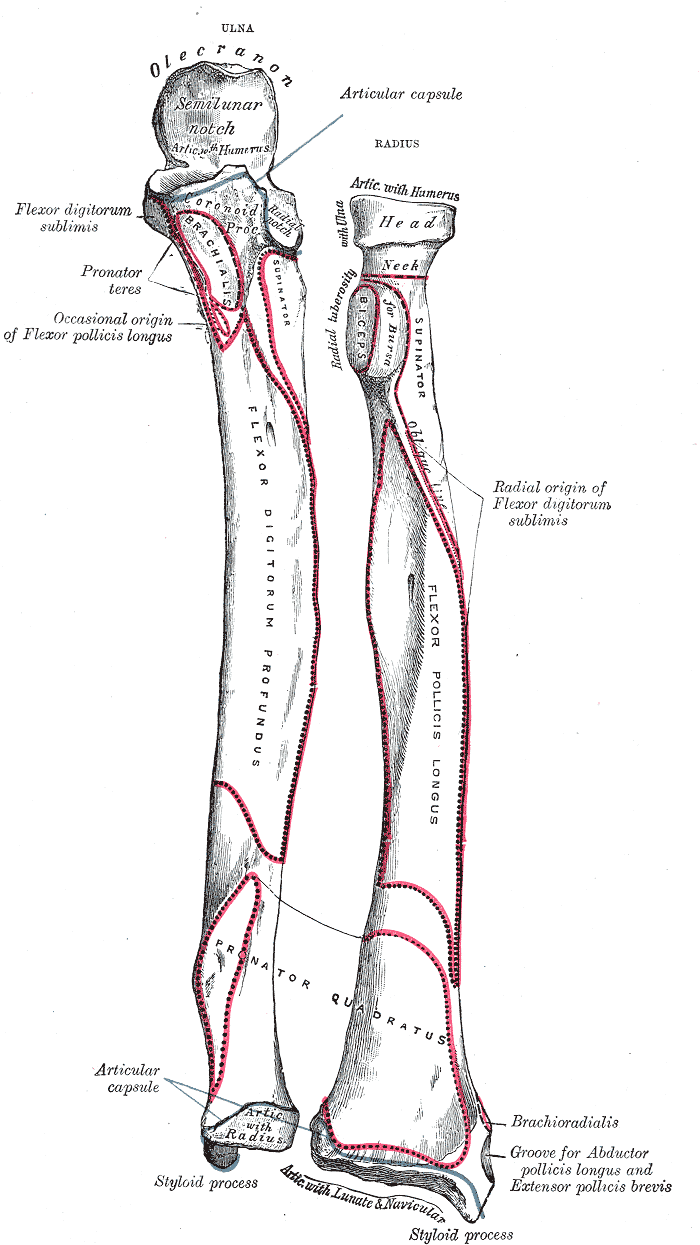
Bones of left forearm. Anterior aspect.

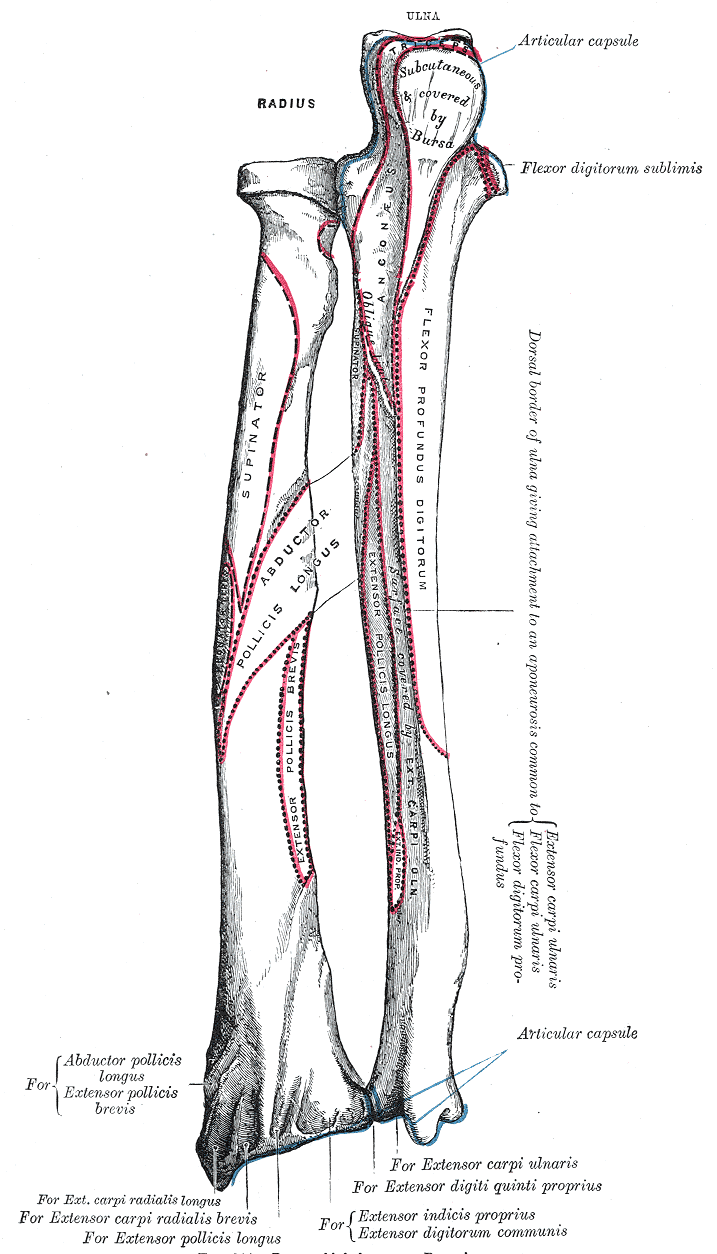
The radius and ulna of the left forearm, posterior surface.

=== Joints ===
The ulna forms part of the wrist joint and elbow joints. Specifically, the ulna joins (articulates) with:

- trochlea of the humerus, at the right side elbow as a hinge joint with semilunar trochlear notch of the ulna.
- the radius, near the elbow as a pivot joint, this allows the radius to cross over the ulna in pronation.
- the distal radius, where it fits into the ulnar notch.
- the radius along its length via the interosseous membrane that forms a syndesmosis joint

=== Muscle attachments ===
Muscle	Direction	Attachment
Triceps brachii muscle	Insertion	posterior part of superior surface of Olecranon process (via common tendon)
Anconeus muscle	Insertion	olecranon process (lateral aspect)
Brachialis muscle	Insertion	anterior surface of the coronoid process of the ulna
Pronator teres muscle	Origin	medial surface on middle portion of coronoid process (also shares origin with medial epicondyle of the humerus)
Flexor carpi ulnaris muscle	Origin	olecranon process and posterior surface of ulna (also shares origin with medial epicondyle of the humerus)
Flexor digitorum superficialis muscle	Origin	coronoid process (also shares origin with medial epicondyle of the humerus and shaft of the radius)
Flexor digitorum profundus muscle	Origin	anteromedial surface of ulna (also shares origin with the interosseous membrane)
Pronator quadratus muscle	Origin	distal portion of anterior ulnar shaft
Extensor carpi ulnaris muscle	Origin	posterior border of ulna (also shares origin with lateral epicondyle of the humerus)
Supinator muscle	Origin	proximal ulna (also shares origin with lateral epicondyle of the humerus)
Abductor pollicis longus muscle	Origin	posterior surface of ulna (also shares origin with the posterior surface of the radius bone)
Extensor pollicis longus muscle	Origin	dorsal shaft of ulna (also shares origin with the dorsal shaft of the radius and the interosseous membrane)
Extensor indicis muscle	Origin	posterior surface of distal ulna (also shares origin with the interosseous membrane)

== Clinical significance ==
=== Fractures ===
Specific types of ulna fracture include:

- Monteggia fracture: a fracture of the proximal third of the ulna with the dislocation of the head of the radius
- Hume fracture: a fracture of the olecranon with an associated anterior dislocation of the radial head

Conservative management is possible for ulnar fractures when they are located in the distal two-thirds, only involve the shaft, with no shortening, less than 10° angulation and less than 50% displacement. In such cases, a cast should be applied that goes above the elbow.

== Other animals ==
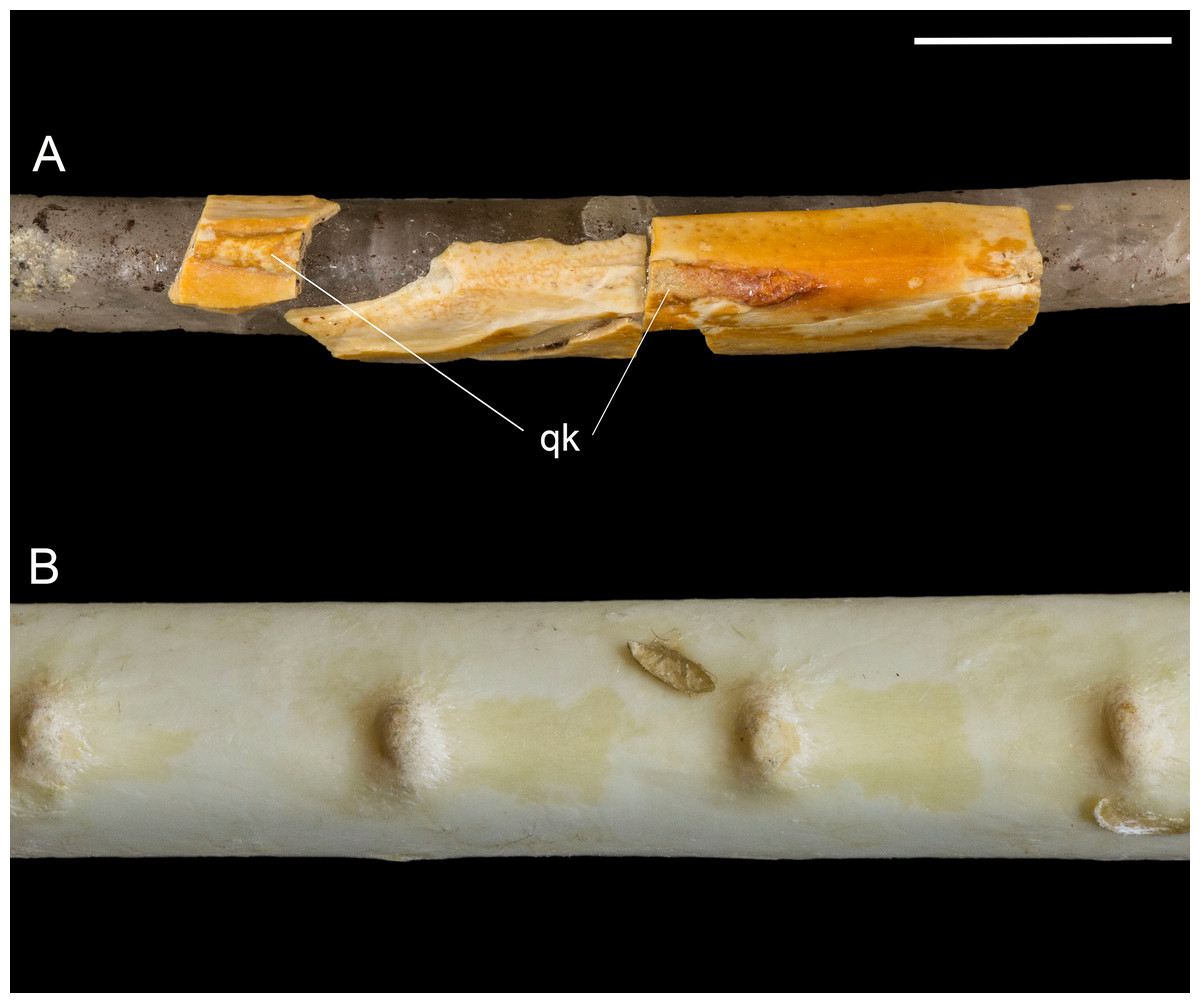
Quill knobs on the ulnae of fossil (top) and modern (bottom) birds.

In four-legged animals, the radius is the main load-bearing bone of the lower forelimb, and the ulna is important primarily for muscular attachment. In many mammals, the ulna is partially or wholly fused with the radius, and may therefore not exist as a separate bone. However, even in extreme cases of fusion, such as in horses, the olecranon process is still present, albeit as a projection from the upper radius.

In birds and other dinosaurs, the ulna forms a surface of attachment for the secondary feathers. These often leave osteological evidence in the form of quill knobs, allowing for identification of feathers in fossils that otherwise lack integumentary information.

== Gallery ==
Position of ulna (red). Animation

3D image

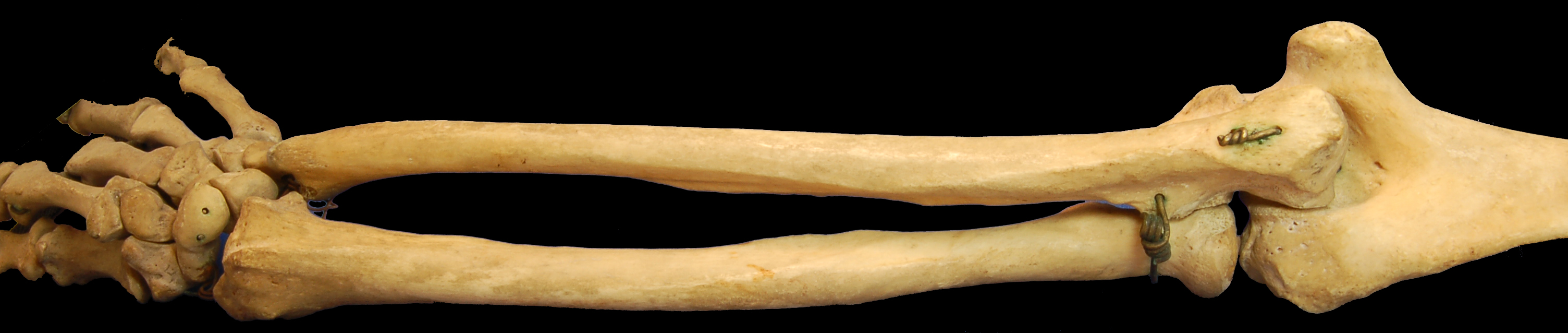
Bones of the right arm, showing the ulna, radius, wrist and humerus

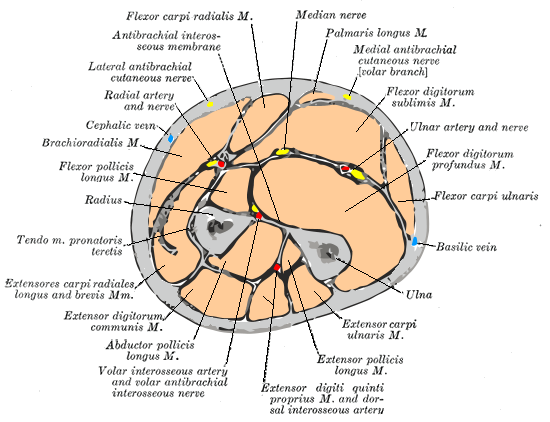
Cross-section through the middle of the right forearm, showing the two bones and the muscles, nerves and blood vessels surrounding them.

Ulna anatomy

== See also ==
- Anatomical terms of bone
- Madelung's deformity
- Terms for anatomical location
- Ulnar artery
- Ulnar nerve
