= Chance fracture =

- Other names: Chance fracture of the spine, flexion distraction fracture, lap seat belt fracture
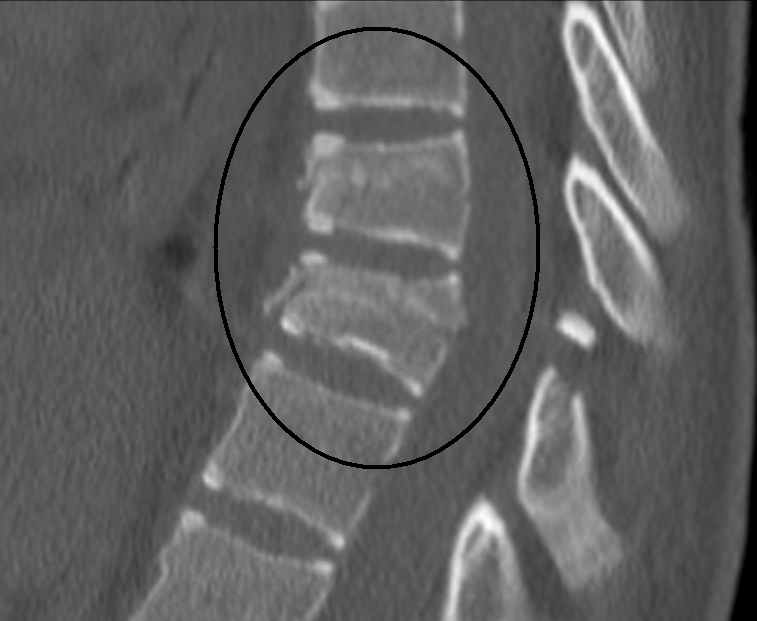
- A Chance fracture of T10 and fracture of T9 due to a seatbelt during an MVC.
- Specialty: Emergency medicine
- Symptoms: Abdominal bruising, paralysis of the legs
- Complications: Splenic rupture, small bowel injury, mesenteric tear
- Risk factors: Head-on motor vehicle collision in which a person is only wearing a lap belt
- Diagnostic method: Medical imaging (X-ray, CT scan)
- Differential diagnosis: Compression fracture, burst fracture
- Treatment: Bracing, surgery
- Frequency: Rare

A Chance fracture is a type of vertebral fracture that results from excessive flexion of the spine. Symptoms may include abdominal bruising (seat belt sign), or less commonly paralysis of the legs. In around half of cases there is an associated abdominal injury such as a splenic rupture, small bowel injury, pancreatic injury, or mesenteric tear. Injury to the bowel may not be apparent on the first day.

The cause is classically a head-on motor vehicle collision in which the affected person is wearing only a lap belt. Being hit in the abdomen with an object like a tree or a fall may also result in this fracture pattern. It often involves disruption of all three columns of the vertebral body (anterior, middle, and posterior). The most common area affected is the lower thoracic and upper lumbar spine. A CT scan is recommended as part of the diagnostic work-up to detect any potential abdominal injuries. The fracture is often unstable.

Treatment may be conservative with the use of a brace or via surgery. The fracture is currently rare. It was first described by G. Q. Chance, a radiologist from Manchester, UK, in 1948. The fracture was more common in the 1950s and 1960s before shoulder harnesses became common.

== Mechanism ==
In some Chance fractures there is a transverse break through the bony spinous process while in others there is a tear of the supraspinous ligament, ligamentum flavum, interspinous ligament, and posterior longitudinal ligament.

== Diagnosis ==
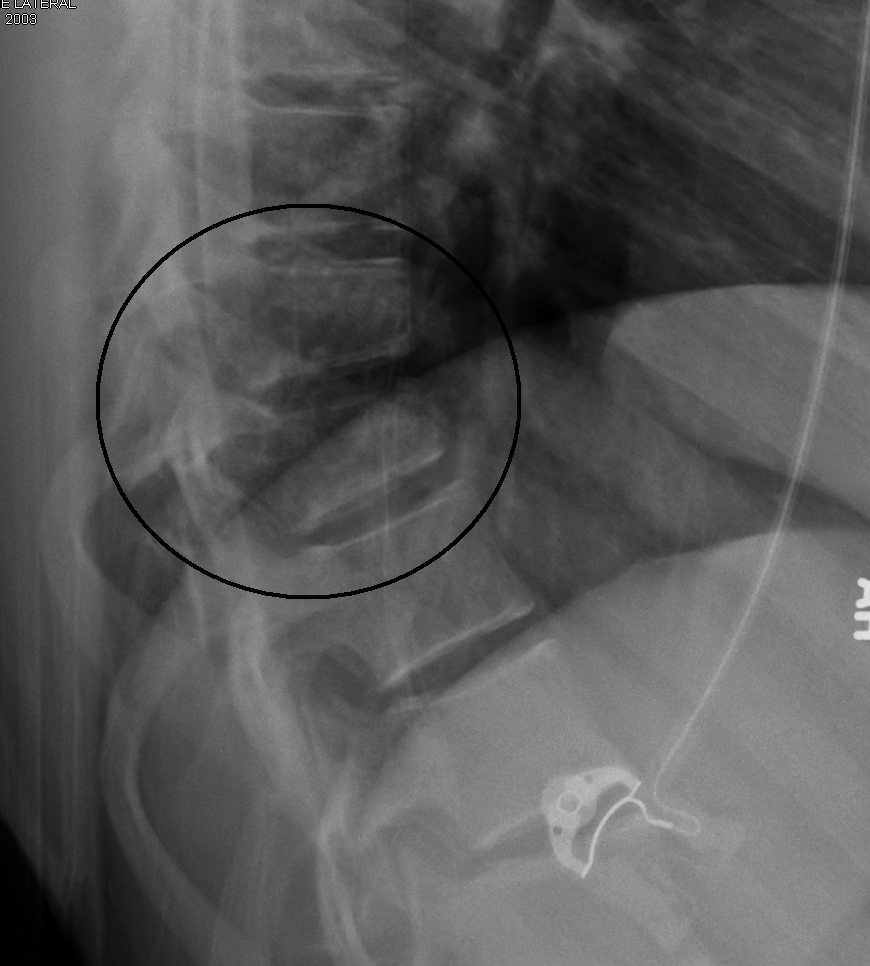
A flexion-distraction fracture of T10 and fracture of T9 due to a seatbelt during an MVC.

On plain X-ray, a Chance fracture may be suspected if two spinous processes are excessively far apart.

A CT scan of the chest, abdomen, and pelvis is recommended as part of the diagnostic work-up to detect any potential abdominal injuries. MRI may also be useful. The fracture is often unstable.

== History ==
It was first described by G. Q. Chance, an Irish radiologist in Manchester, UK, in 1948. The fracture was more common in the 1950s and 1960s before shoulder harnesses became common.
