= Essex-Lopresti fracture =

- Specialty: Orthopaedics
- Symptoms: Dislocation of the forearm
- Complications: Mal-union
- Causes: Sudden fall on an outstretched hand
- Treatment: Open reduction and internal fixation with plates
- Prognosis: Good if treated early
- Deaths: Not applicable

The Essex-Lopresti fracture is a fracture of the radial head of the forearm with concomitant dislocation of the distal radio-ulnar joint along with disruption of the thin interosseous membrane which holds them together. The injury is named after Peter Essex-Lopresti who described it in 1951.

== Cause ==
This fracture typically occurs in patients who have fallen on an outstretched hand (a "FOOSH" injury).

== Diagnosis ==
The injury can be difficult to diagnose initially as medical attention is usually focused on the injury to the radial head, leading to the distal radio-ulnar injury being overlooked. The examination finding of tenderness of the distal radio-ulnar joint suggests an Essex-Lopresti injury in patients who have sustained high energy forearm trauma. Plain radiography shows the radial head fracture, with dorsal subluxation of the ulna often seen on lateral view of the pronated wrist.

== Management ==
The radial head fracture is usually managed by open reduction internal fixation under general anaesthesia: the area is opened surgically, the surgeon forces the bones back into their correct positions, and then fixes them in place using titanium pins and/ or plates; if the fracture is too comminuted (i.e., the bones have been crushed or fractured into many pieces) a radial head implant can be used. Excision/ removal of the radial head should be avoided, as over time this will cause the rest of the radius to migrate proximally leading to wrist pain and loss of pronation and supination of the wrist. Delayed treatment of the radial head fracture will also lead to proximal migration of the radius.

The distal radio-ulnar joint dislocation can be reduced by supination of the forearm, and may be pinned in place for 6 weeks to allow healing of the interosseous membrane.

== Outcomes ==
Most healthy individuals can recover from this type of injury within 10 weeks. However, as with most bone fractures, there is always the possibility of malunion between bone fragments.
