= Acronym Finder =

Online dictionary and database of abbreviations

- Screenshot
- Website type: Dictionary
- Available in: English
- Owners: Farlex, Inc.
- Website: www.acronymfinder.com
- Commercial: Yes
- Registration: None
- Launched: September 2, 1998; 28 years ago
- Current status: Online
- Content license: Copyrighted

Acronym Finder (AF) is a free, online, searchable dictionary and database of abbreviations (acronyms, initialisms, and others) and their meanings.

The entries are classified into categories such as Information Technology, Military/Government, Science, Slang/Pop Culture etc. It also contains a database of the United States and Canadian postal codes. For abbreviations with multiple meanings, they are listed by popularity, with the most common one being listed first. As of 2018, it claims to have over a million "human-edited" and verified definitions.

== History ==
Acronym Finder was registered and the database put online by Michael K. Molloy of Colorado in 1997, but he began compiling it in 1985, working as a computer systems officer for the USAF. Molloy first saw the need of an acronym list while integrating computers at the Randolph Air Force Base in Texas, his first acronym list running up to 30 pages. When he had retired and put AF online in 1997, his list already had 43,000 acronyms. It began mainly as a list of Military/Government abbreviations before expanding to other areas.

Molloy and his wife served as the editors of the website, verifying user submissions for abbreviations and adding others they found to the database. Molloy has also provided opinions on abbreviations such as "MSG" which Madison Square Garden wanted as a domain name (msg.com), claiming trademark to the abbreviated letters. He stated that MSG also stood for more common things such as monosodium glutamate and message, among others. The Garden in the end settled out of court and came to own msg.com.

The website was maintained under Mountain Data Systems, LLC by Molloy, before being sold off and eventually coming under the ownership of Farlex, Inc. publishers of Thefreedictionary.com.

== Content ==
The website contains a database of meanings and expansions for abbreviations, acronyms, initialisms mainly in English but includes some entries in other languages such as French, German, Spanish etc. as well. It is freely accessible. The entries are further classified into categories such as Information Technology, Military/Government, Science, Slang/Pop Culture etc. It also contains a database of US and Canadian postal codes which are shown on a Map along with location information. Abbreviations with multiple expansions are listed by popularity with the most common one being presented first, these can be sorted alphabetically as well.

Anyone can contribute to the database by submitting abbreviations and their meanings, these are reviewed by an editor and categorized before being added to the database. While the database has been described as fairly accurate errors have been found in the meanings and expansions of abbreviations. The website does not list sources for the abbreviations and their meanings but it does identify people who have contributed more than 50 abbreviations to the database.

The database only contains abbreviations and their expansions and does not list other data such as grammatical category, context, source, field of the abbreviation etc.

Farlex, Inc. The current owner of the website also publishes mobile apps for the Android and iOS operating systems.

Acronym Finder also includes a Systematic Buzz Phrase Projector, a light-hearted tool that randomly generates jargon-like phrases and abbreviations—usually initialisms that would be unpronounceable as acronyms—and meanings from 30 chosen buzz words.

The website is supported through advertisements.

== Reputation ==
The website is listed as a quick reference tool in directories like Stanford Library, Library of Congress, USC Library. It has been cited as the largest database of acronyms and has been used in computational studies for its database.

Listings of abbreviations on the website have also been used as a defense that an abbreviation is in public use and cannot be trademarked. While in some trademark cases citations for AF have been accepted it has been described as an unreliable reference in others.

It has garnered criticism for the fact that anyone can submit abbreviations to the site and the content is user generated. Mike Molloy the site's original owner had defended that each submission is verified before being added to the database.
