= George Quentin Chance =

Irish radiologist

- Born: 1904; Dublin
- Known for: Chance fracture
- Medical career
- Profession: Radiologist

George Quentin Chance (born 1904) was an Irish radiologist. His note of 1948 titled "Note on a Type of Flexion Fracture of the Spine", published in the British Journal of Radiology described three cases of fractures across the vertebra and neural arch, the 'Chance fracture'.

He was born into a medical family, the fifth son of the Irish surgeon Sir Arthur Chance; his mother was Sir Arthur's second wife Eileen Murphy.

== Selected publications ==
- Cullen, C H; Chance, G Q (1943). "Air arthrography in lesions of the semilunar cartilages". British Journal of Surgery. 30 (119): 241–245. doi:10.1002/bjs.18003011911. ISSN 0007-1323. S2CID 72015144.
- Doupe, J; Cullen, CH; Chance, GQ (January 1944). "Post-traumatic pain and the causalgia syndrome". Journal of Neurology and Psychiatry. 7 (1–2): 33–48. doi:10.1136/jnnp.7.1-2.33. PMC 1090439. PMID 21623413.
- Chance, G. Q. (September 1948). "Note on a type of flexion fracture of the spine". The British Journal of Radiology. 21 (249): 452–453. doi:10.1259/0007-1285-21-249-452. ISSN 0007-1285. PMID 18878306.
