= Galeazzi fracture =

Galeazzi fracture-dislocation
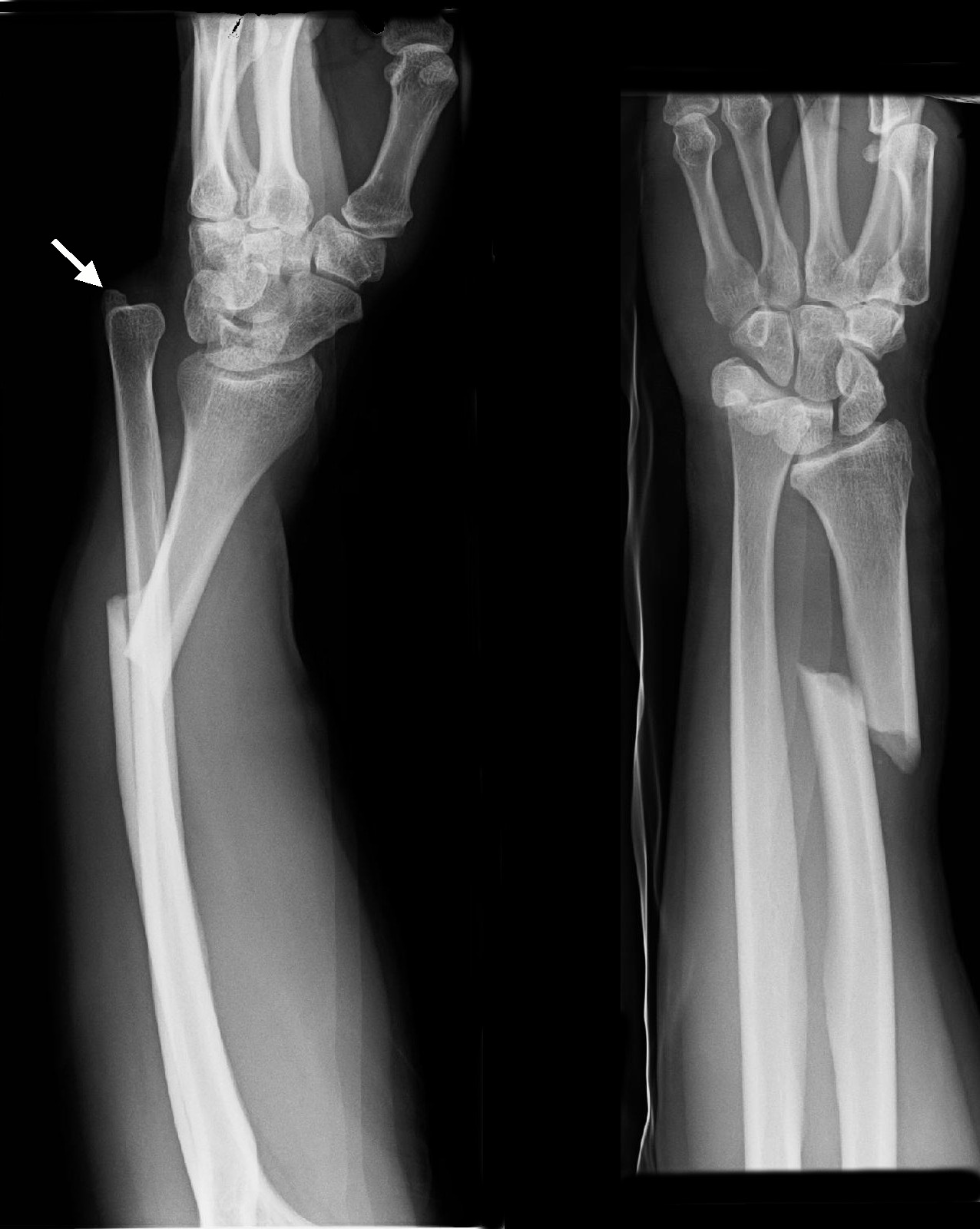
- Galeazzi fracture. Arrow points at the dislocated ulnar head
- Specialty: Orthopedic

The Galeazzi fracture is a fracture of the distal third of the radius with dislocation of the distal radioulnar joint. It classically involves an isolated fracture of the junction of the distal third and middle third of the radius with associated subluxation or dislocation of the distal radio-ulnar joint; the injury disrupts the forearm axis joint.

== Signs and symptoms ==
Pain and soft-tissue swelling are present at the distal-third radial fracture site and at the wrist joint. This injury is confirmed on radiographic evaluation. Forearm trauma may be associated with compartment syndrome. Anterior interosseous nerve (AIN) palsy may also be present, but it is easily missed because there is no sensory component to this finding. A purely motor nerve, the AIN is a division of the median nerve. Injury to the AIN can cause paralysis of the flexor pollicis longus and flexor digitorum profundus muscles to the index finger, resulting in loss of the pinch mechanism between the thumb and index finger. Galeazzi fractures are sometimes associated with wrist drop due to injury to radial nerve, extensor tendons or muscles.

== Pathophysiology ==
The dislocation of ulnar head in Galeazzi fracture dislocation may be dorsal (commoner) or volar (rare) depending on the mechanism of injury. If the fall is on the outstretched hand with forearm in pronation, the dislocation is dorsal, and if forearm is in supination at the time of injury, the dislocation is volar.

After the injury, the fracture is subject to deforming forces including those of the brachioradialis, pronator quadratus, and thumb extensors, as well as the weight of the hand. The deforming muscular and soft-tissue injuries that are associated with this fracture cannot be controlled with plaster immobilization.

== Treatment ==
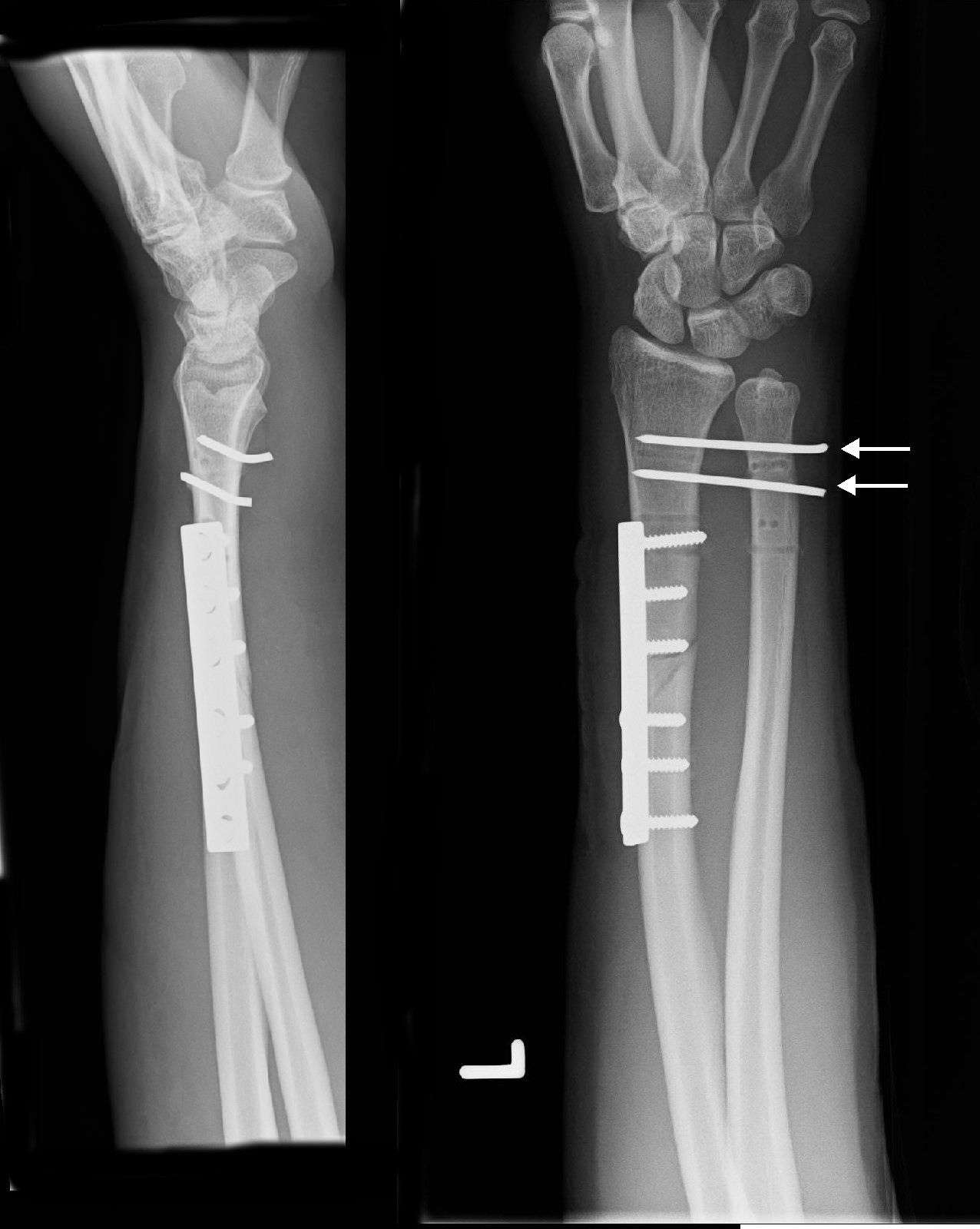
Galeazzi fracture after surgical fixation

Galeazzi fractures are best treated with open reduction of the radius and the distal radio-ulnar joint. It has been called the "fracture of necessity," because it necessitates open surgical treatment in the adult. Nonsurgical treatment results in persistent or recurrent dislocations of the distal ulna. However, in skeletally immature patients such as children, the fracture is typically treated with closed reduction.

== Epidemiology ==
Galeazzi fractures account for 3-7% of all forearm fractures. They are seen most often in males. Although Galeazzi fracture patterns are reportedly uncommon, they are estimated to account for 7% of all forearm fractures in adults. They are associated with a fall on an outstretched arm.

== History ==
The Galeazzi fracture is named after Riccardo Galeazzi (1866–1952), an Italian surgeon at the Instituto de Rachitici in Milan, who described the fracture in 1934. However, it was first described in 1842 by Cooper, 92 years before Galeazzi reported his results.

== See also ==
- Monteggia fracture
