= Hume fracture =

- Specialty: Orthopedic

The Hume fracture is an injury of the elbow comprising a fracture of the olecranon with an associated anterior dislocation of the radial head which occurs in children. It was originally described as an undisplaced olecranon fracture, but more recently includes displaced fractures and can be considered a variant of the Monteggia fracture.

The injury was described in 1957 by A.C. Hume of the orthopaedic surgery department of St. Bartholomew's Hospital, Rochester.

== Cause ==
Although the precise mechanism of injury is unclear, the injury occurs in children who have fallen heavily with their arm trapped under the body. In his original description of the injury, Hume suggested that the injury occurred as a result of hyperextension of the elbow leading to fracture of the olecranon, with pronation of the forearm leading to the radial head dislocation.

== Management ==
In the original description by Hume, where the olecranon fractures were not displaced, treatment consisted of closed reduction of the radial head dislocation under general anaesthesia by supination of the forearm. This was followed by immobilisation of the arm in a plaster cast with the elbow flexed at 90° and the forearm in supination for 6 weeks.

Where the olecranon fracture is displaced, open reduction internal fixation is recommended. Once the olecranon has been repaired, closed reduction of the radial head dislocation is usually possible. This is followed by immobilisation with the elbow flexed to 90° and the forearm in the neutral position. The duration of immobilisation depends on clinical assessment of the joint, and mobilisation may be possible after as little as 4 weeks.
