= Capsule of hip joint =

Attachment of the hip joint

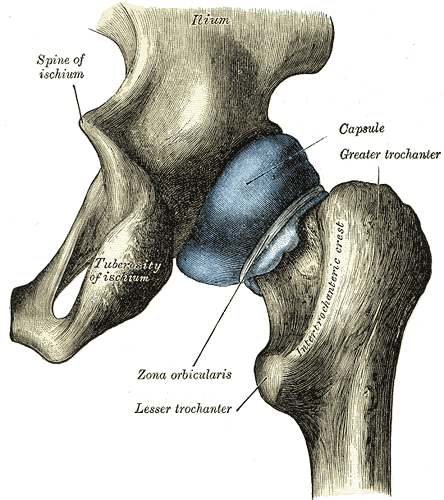
- Capsule of hip-joint (distended). Posterior aspect.

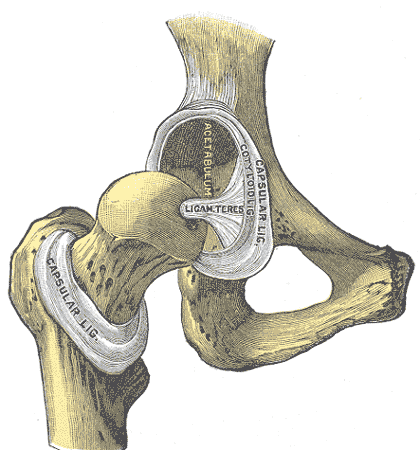
- Hip-joint, front view. The capsular ligament has been largely removed. (Capsular ligament visible at center.)

Details

Identifiers
- Latin: capsula articularis coxae

The capsule of hip joint, articular capsule, or capsular ligament is strong and dense attachment of the hip joint.

Anterosuperiorly, it is attached to the margin of the acetabulum 5 to 6 mm beyond the labrum behind; but in front, it is attached to the outer margin of the labrum, and, opposite to the notch where the margin of the cavity is deficient, it is connected to the transverse ligament, and by a few fibers to the edge of the obturator foramen.

It surrounds the neck of the femur, and is attached, in front, to the intertrochanteric line; above, to the base of the neck; behind, to the neck, about 1.25 cm above the intertrochanteric crest; below, to the lower part of the neck, close to the lesser trochanter.

From its femoral attachment some of the fibers are reflected upward along the neck as longitudinal bands, termed retinacula.

The capsule is much thicker at the upper and forepart of the joint, where the most resistance is required; behind and below, it is thin and loose.

It consists of two sets of fibers, circular and longitudinal.

The circular fibers, zona orbicularis, are most abundant at the lower and back part of the capsule, and form a sling or collar around the neck of the femur.

Anteriorly they blend with the deep surface of the iliofemoral ligament, and gain an attachment to the anterior inferior iliac spine.

The longitudinal fibers are greatest in amount at the upper and front part of the capsule, where they are reinforced by distinct bands, or accessory ligaments, of which the most important is the iliofemoral ligament.

The other accessory bands are known as the pubofemoral ligament and the ischiofemoral ligament.

The external surface of the capsule is rough, covered by numerous muscles, and separated in front from the psoas major and iliacus by the iliopectineal bursa, which not infrequently communicates by a circular aperture with the cavity of the joint.

== Pathologies ==
Hip Capsule Contracture

This pathology is similar to the frozen shoulder. It may be caused by arthritis or by a long period of immobilization

Capsular Pattern :

- According to Cyriax : ROM of Medial rotation, flexion and abduction are more reduced than extension

End-Feels

- The end-feel is abnormal when there's a capsule contracture.
- you may feel a firm capsular end-feel, but it's before the complete ROM.
- it may be empty, caused by severe pain
