= Hip dislocation =

Orthopedic injury

Dislocation of hip
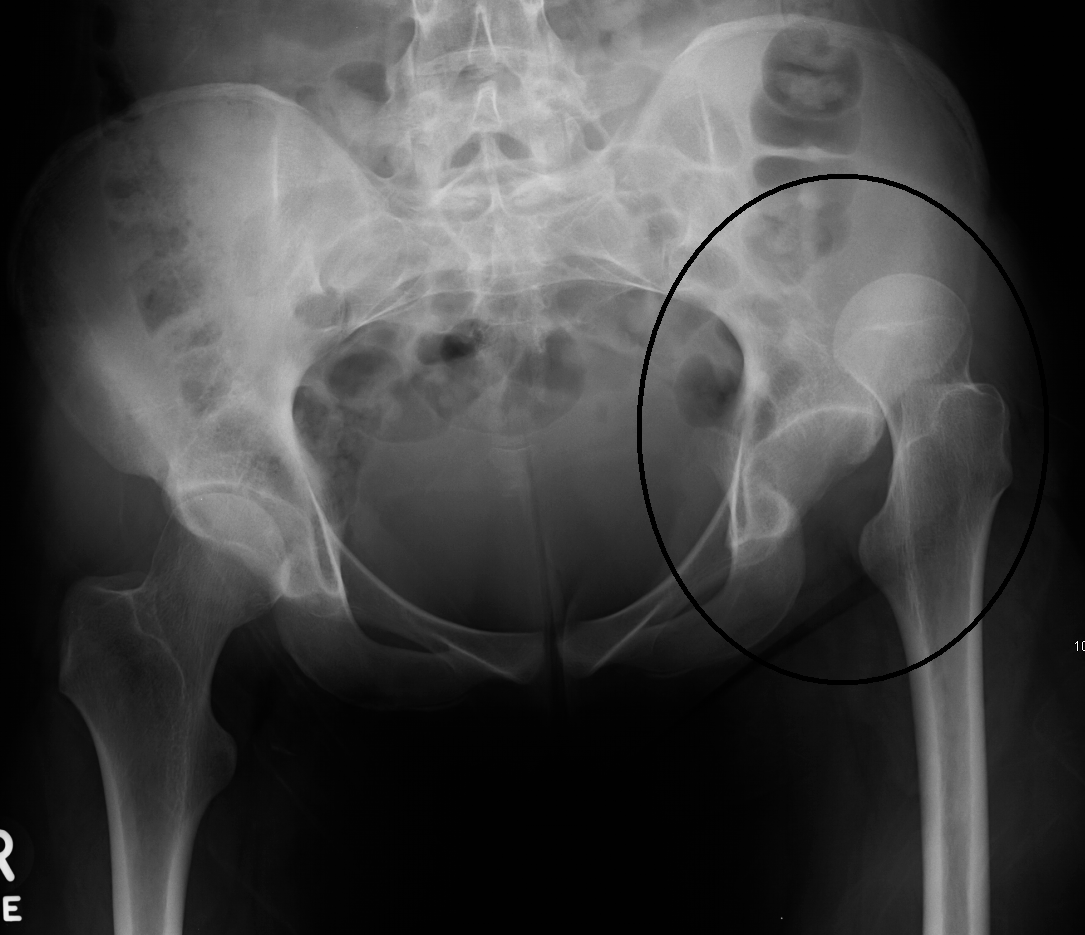
- X-ray showing a joint dislocation of the left hip.
- Specialty: Orthopedics
- Symptoms: Hip pain, trouble moving the hip
- Complications: Avascular necrosis of the hip, arthritis
- Types: Anterior, posterior
- Causes: Trauma, hip dysplasia
- Diagnostic method: Confirmed by X-rays
- Differential diagnosis: Hip fracture, hip dysplasia
- Prevention: Seat-belts
- Treatment: Reduction of the hip carried out under procedural sedation
- Prognosis: Variable

A hip dislocation refers to a condition in which the thighbone (femur) separates from the hip bone (pelvis). Specifically it is when the ball–shaped head of the femur (femoral head) separates from its cup–shaped socket in the hip bone, known as the acetabulum. The joint of the femur and pelvis (hip joint) is very stable, secured by both bony and soft-tissue constraints. With that, dislocation would require significant force which typically results from significant trauma such as from a motor vehicle collision or from a fall from elevation. Hip dislocations can also occur following a hip replacement or from a developmental abnormality known as hip dysplasia.

Hip dislocations are classified by fracture association and by the positioning of the dislocated femoral head. A posteriorly positioned head is the most common dislocation type. Hip dislocations are a medical emergency, requiring prompt placement of the femoral head back into the acetabulum (reduction). This reduction of the femoral head back into the hip socket is typically done under sedation and without surgery, through maneuvers including traction on the thighbone in line with the dislocation. If this is unsuccessful or if there is an associated fracture in need of repair, surgery is required. It often takes 2–3 months for a dislocated hip to fully heal, and it can take even longer depending on associated injuries such as fracture.

Typically, people with hip dislocations present with severe pain and an inability to move the affected leg. Diagnosis is made by physical exam and plain X-rays of the hips. A CT scan is recommended following reduction to rule out complications. Complications include osteonecrosis, femoral head fractures, and posttraumatic osteoarthritis.

Males are affected more often than females. Traumatic dislocations occurs most commonly in those 16 to 40 years old. Half of all hip dislocations are accompanied by a fracture. The condition was first described in the medical press in the early 1800s.

== Classifications ==
Dislocations are categorized as simple if there is no associated fracture, and complex if there is. In addition, hip dislocations are classified depending on the location of the head of the femur as follows:

=== Posterior dislocation ===
Posterior dislocations is when the femoral head lies posteriorly after dislocation. It is the most common pattern of dislocation accounting for 90% of hip dislocations, and those with an associated fracture are categorized by the Thompson and Epstein classification system, the Stewart and Milford classification system, and the Pipkin system (when associated with femoral head fractures).

=== Anterior dislocation ===
Anterior dislocations is when the femoral head lies anteriorly after dislocation. Anterior dislocations are subdivided into two types being inferior (obturator) dislocation and superior (iliac or pubic) dislocation. There is also a Thompson and Epstein classification system for anterior hip dislocations.

To note, Central dislocation is an outdated term for displacement of the femoral head towards the body's center into a fractured acetabulum and is no longer used. Moreover, the term "congenital" dislocation is no longer recommended, except for very rare conditions, in which there is a "teratologic" fixed dislocation location present at birth.

== Signs and symptoms ==
The affected leg is usually extremely painful, precluding weight-bearing and movement. Nerve injuries also can accompany dislocations, necessitating careful neurovascular examination. Deformity is also present, which is based on concomitant injuries and the type of dislocation:

=== Posterior dislocation ===
For posterior dislocation, the affected limb will be in a position of flexion, adduction, and internal rotation. This is to say, the affected leg will be bent upwards at the hip, while being shifted and pointed towards the middle of the body. Sciatic nerve injury is also present in 8%-20% of cases, conferring numbness and weakness to aspects of the lower leg.

=== Anterior dislocation ===
For anterior dislocation, the affected limb will be in a position of abduction and external rotation. The degree of flexion depends on whether it is a superior or inferior dislocation, with the former resulting in hip extension and the latter, hip flexion. This is to say that with superior and inferior anterior dislocations, the affected leg will be bent at the hip backwards and upwards respectively, while being shifted and pointed away from the body. Femoral nerve palsies can also be present, conferring leg numbness and weakness, however are uncommon.

== Mechanism ==
=== Functional anatomy ===
The hip joint includes the articulation of the spherical femoral head (of femur) and the concave acetabulum (of pelvis). It forms a ball-and-socket joint that is encased by an articular capsule, reinforced and stabilized by muscle, tendon, and ligaments. Even so, the joint is quite flexible in movement, allowing three degrees of freedom.

Major ligaments conferring stability to the hip joint include the iliofemoral ligament, the ischiofemoral ligament, the pubofemoral ligament, and the ligament of the head of the femur. The former three ligaments form the zona orbicularis or annular ligament which encases the femoral neck, stabilizing the joint capsule. The strength of a healthy hip, reinforced and stabilized by the aforementioned structures can withstand over 1000 lbs. of force.

=== Cause ===
With this, to dislocate a healthy hip requires a great deal of force. About 65% of cases are related to motor vehicle collisions, with falls from elevation and sports injuries causing the majority of the rest. Moreover, wear and tear of the body with aging increases the older population's susceptibility to hip dislocation.

Posterior dislocations happen with direct trauma to a bent (flexed) knee as is the case with a dashboard injury in a motor vehicle accident. The positioning of the hip at the time of impact determines associated injuries, with abduction of the hip making a complex hip dislocation more likely, while adduction and flexion of the hip favors a simple hip dislocation.

Anterior dislocations happen with trauma forcing external rotation and abduction of the hip. In the setting of forced external rotation and abduction of the hip, the hip flexed and extended leads to the inferior and superior sub-types of anterior hip dislocation, respectively. Hip dysplasia also makes one more susceptible to hip dislocation. Hip dysplasia is a congenital condition in which the hip is deformed in a way that decreases the congruency between the head of the femur and the acetabulum of the pelvis. Bony congruence is a stabilizing factor to the hip joint, so the decrease in this conferred by hip dysplasia makes one more susceptible to dislocation.

== Diagnosis ==
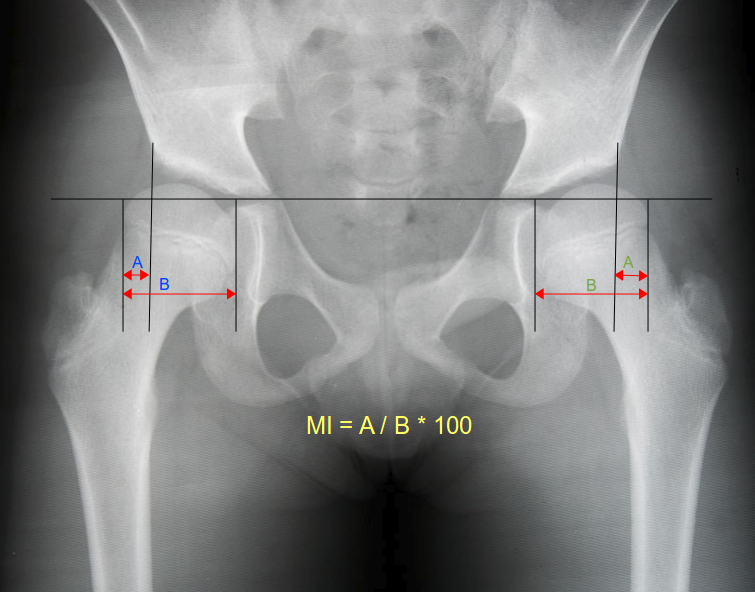
Reimer's migration index can be used to indicate hip dislocation. The migration index (MI) is normally less than 33%.

An anterior-posterior (AP) X-ray of the pelvis and a cross-table lateral X-ray of the effected hip are ordered for diagnosis. The size of the head of the femur is then compared across both sides of the pelvis. The affected femoral head will appear larger if the dislocation is anterior, and smaller if posterior. A CT scan may also be ordered to clarify the fracture pattern.

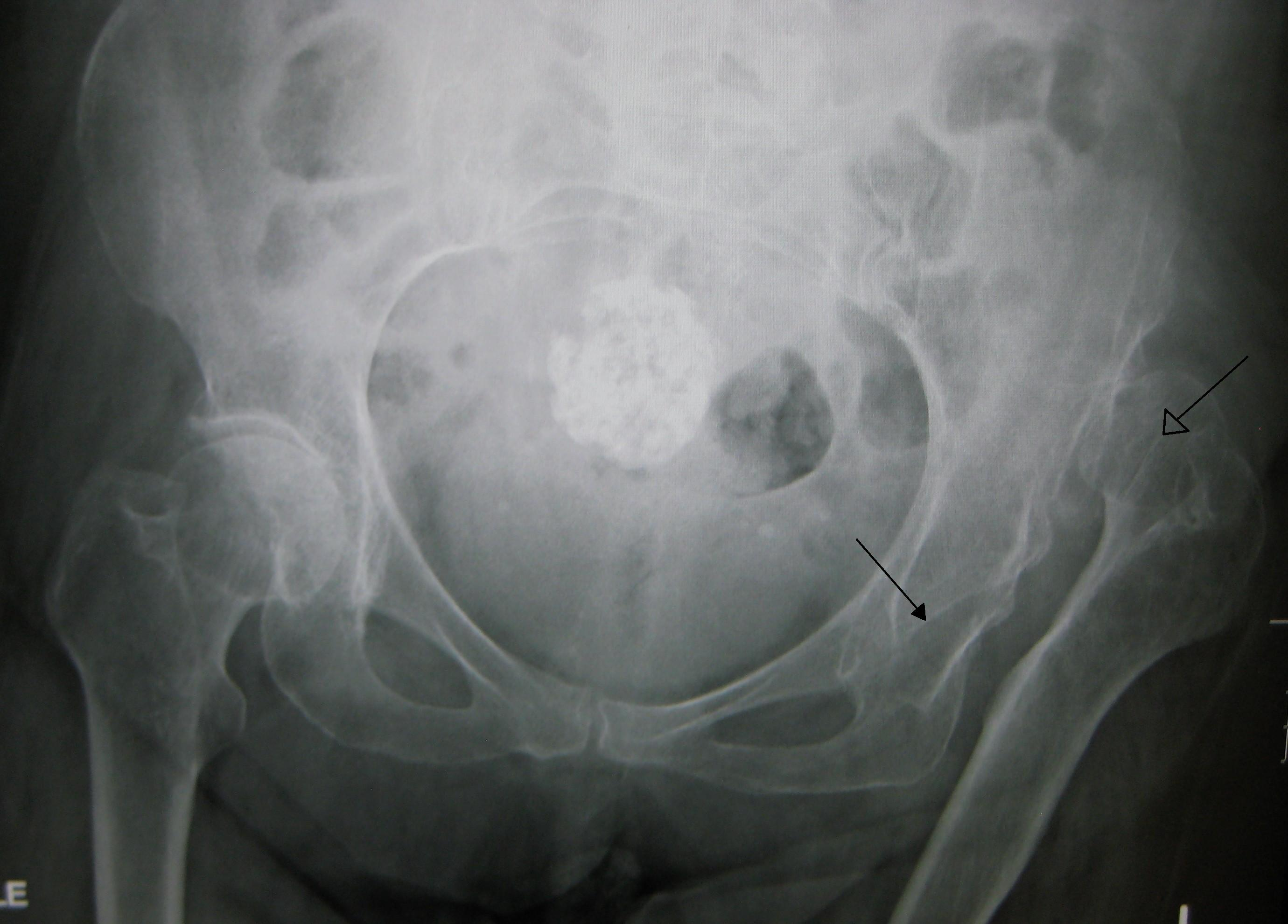
Dislocation of the left hip, secondary to developmental hip dysplasia. Closed arrow marks the acetabulum, open arrow the femoral head.

== Management ==
Hip dislocations are a medical emergency, requiring timely placement of the femoral head back into the acetabulum (reduction) in order to reduce the risk of osteonecrosis of the femoral head. Most professionals recommend closed reduction (nonoperative) barring operative indications such as irreducible dislocation, delayed presentation, non-concentric reduction, fracture requiring excision and/or open reduction internal fixation (ORIF) among other operative indications. Prognosis is worsened if reduction is delayed more than 6 hours. If the reduction is stable, the patient can proceed to protective weight bearing which includes crutch-assisted walking (ambulation) with weight bearing as tolerated for 4–6 weeks succeeding a short period of bed rest. If reduction is unstable, 4–6 weeks of skeletal traction is necessary before protective weight bearing.

=== Nonoperative ===
The hip should be reduced as quickly as possible to reduce the risk of osteonecrosis of the femoral head. This is done through manual traction of the thigh inline with the dislocation under general anesthesia and muscle relaxation, or conscious sedation. Fractures of the femoral head and other loose bodies should be determined prior to reduction. Of note, femoral neck fractures, femoral head fractures, and incarcerated fracture fragments preventing joint reduction are contraindications. Common closed reduction methods include the Allis method, Stimson Gravity Technique, and the Bigelow maneuvers. Once reduction is completed, management becomes less urgent and appropriate workup including CT scanning can be completed.

=== Operative ===
Open (surgical) reduction indications include an irreducible dislocation, fracture with fragments preventing congruent reduction, fracture requiring an ORIF, delayed presentation, and non-concentric reduction. Approaches to surgical reductions include the posterior approach for posterior dislocations (Kocher-Langenbeck), and the anterior (Smith-Petersen) approach for anterior dislocations. A CT scan or Judet views should be obtained prior to transfer to the surgical suite.

=== Rehabilitation ===
Individuals with hip dislocation should participate in physical therapy and receive professional prescriptive exercises based on their individual abilities, progress, and overall range of motion. The following are some typical recommended exercises used as rehabilitation for hip dislocation. It is important to understand that each individual has different capabilities that can best be assessed by a physical therapist or medical professional, and that these are simply recommendations.

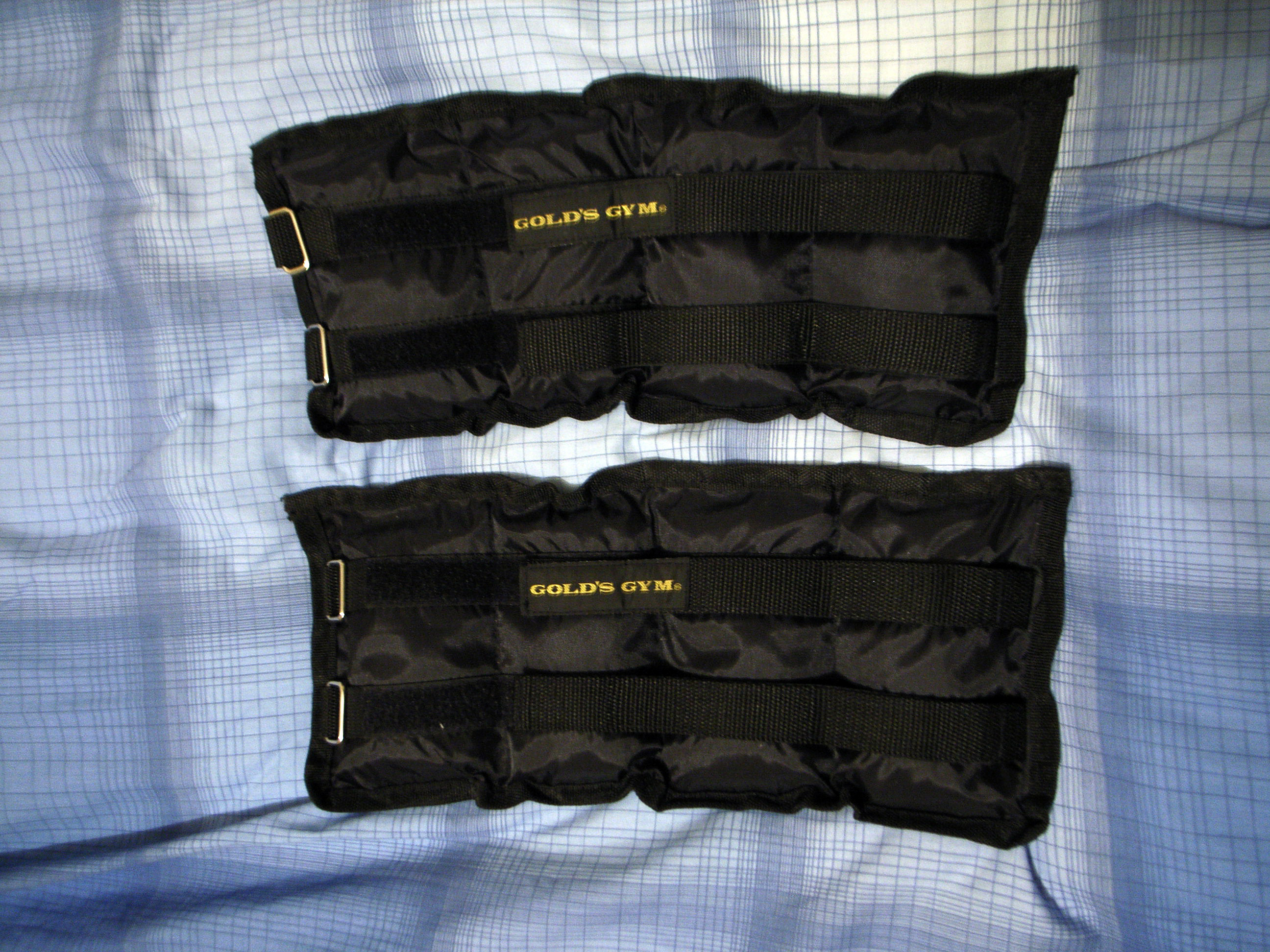
A set of ankle weights.

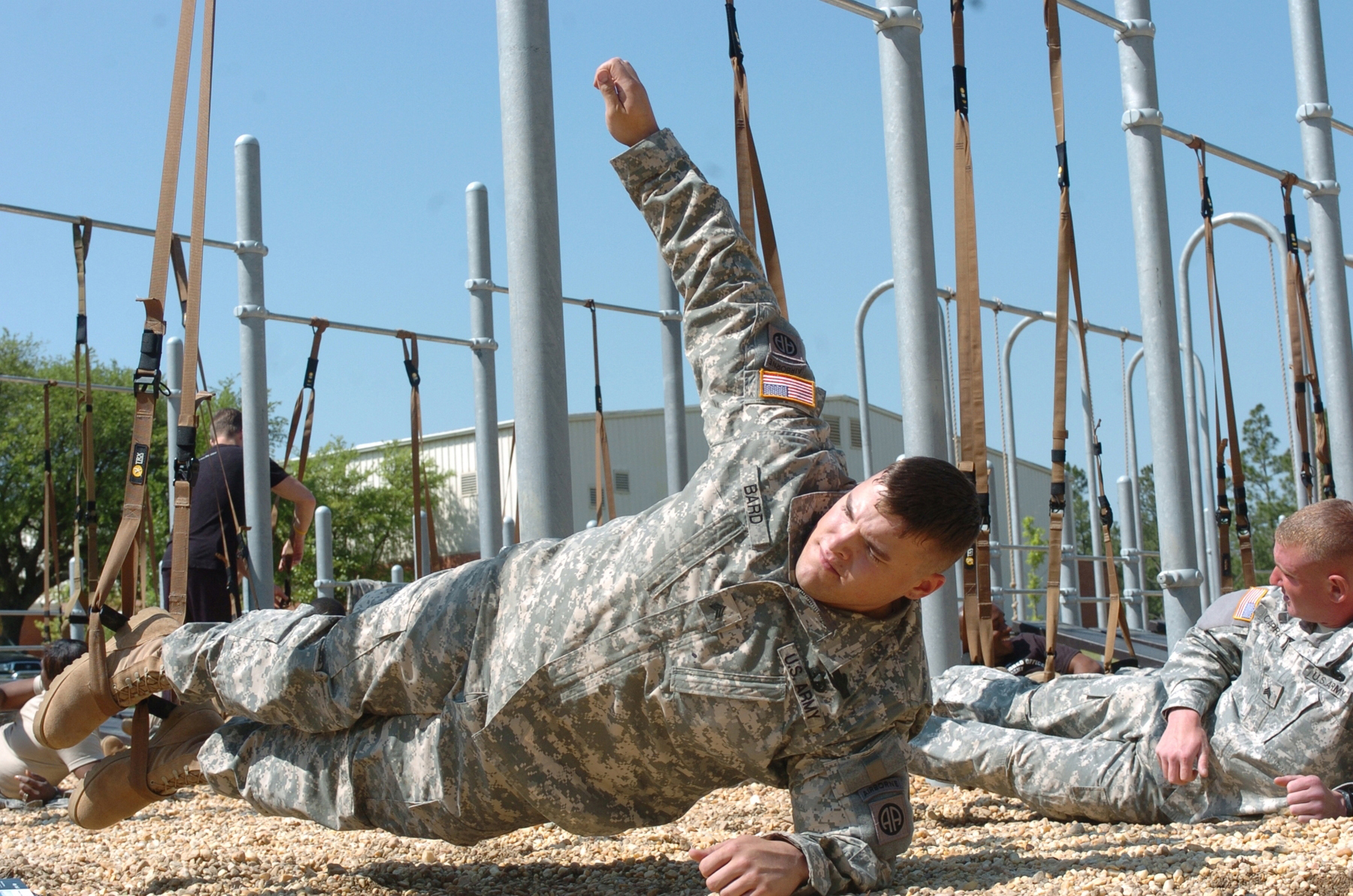
Modified side plank.

==== Exercises ====
- Bridge- Lie flat on back. Place arms with palms down beside body. Keep feet hip distance apart and bend knees. Slowly lift hips upward. Hold position for three to five seconds. This helps strengthen the glutes and increase stability of the hip joint.
- Supine leg abduction- Lie flat on back. Slowly slide leg away from body and then back in, keeping the knees straight. This exercises the gluteus medius and helps to maintain stability in the hip while walking.
- Side Lying Leg abduction- Lie on one side with one leg on top of the other. Slowly lift the top leg towards the ceiling and then lower it back down slowly.
- Standing Hip abduction- Standing up and holding on to a nearby surface, slowly lift one leg away from the midline of the body and then lower it back to starting position. This is simply a more advanced way to do any of the lying hip abduction exercises, and should be done as the person progresses in rehab.
- Knee raises- While standing and holding onto a chair, slowly lift one leg off the ground and bring it closer to the body while bending the knee. Then lower the leg back down slowly. This helps to strengthen the hip flexor muscles and retain stability in the hip.
- Hip flexion and extensions- Standing, hold on to a nearby chair or surface. Swing one leg forwards away from you, and hold the position for three to five seconds. Then swing the leg slowly backwards and behind your body. Hold for three to five seconds. This exercise helps to increase range of motion, as well as strengthening the hip flexor and hip extensor muscles that control much of the hip joint.
- Adding ankle weights to any exercises can be done as progress is made in rehabilitation.

== Prognosis ==
Hip dislocations can take anywhere from 2–3 months to fully heal, and even longer depending on associated injuries such as fracture. Moreover, the outcome ranges from a fully healthy hip to a painful, arthritic one. With simple posterior dislocations, literature reports great outcomes in 70%-80% of cases. With complex dislocations, the outcome is often governed by the associated fracture. Anterior dislocations are noted to have worse outcomes with their higher likelihood of being associated with femoral head injuries. Those without associated femoral head injuries do better.

Complications of hip dislocation that impact prognosis include post-traumatic arthritis, femoral head osteonecrosis, femoral head fracture, neurovascular injury, and recurrent dislocation. Post-traumatic arthritis is the most common long-term complication and happens in 20% of hip dislocations, having higher rates among complex dislocations. Femoral head osteonecrosis happens in 5-40% of dislocations, with rates rising the longer time to reduction (>6 hours). Similarly increasing in rates with time to reduction, neurovascular injury with most notable being sciatic nerve injury, occurs in 8-20% of cases. Femoral head fractures accompany 10% of posterior dislocations and 25-75% of anterior dislocations. Lastly, recurrent dislocations can also occur, however is rare (<2%).

== Epidemiology ==
Males are affected more often than females. Most common cause is high energy trauma such as from a motor vehicle collision or a high-level fall. Traumatic dislocations occur most commonly in those 16 to 40 years old. Of note, restrained passengers are at a lower risk for a hip dislocation than those unrestrained. With the hip being inherently stable, dislocations are rare, however have high rates of associated injuries. For example, half of all hip dislocations are accompanied by a fracture. Refer to "Prognosis and Complications" section for rates of other associated injuries. The condition was first described in the medical press in the early 1800s.
