= Femoroacetabular impingement =

- Other names: Hip impingement syndrome, femoroacetabular impingement syndrome (FAIS)
- Video of the three types of femoroacetabular impingement.
- Specialty: Orthopedics

Femoroacetabular impingement (FAI) is a condition involving one or more anatomical abnormalities of the hip joint, which is a ball and socket joint. It is a common cause of hip pain and discomfort in young and middle-aged adults.

It occurs when the ball shaped femoral head contacts the acetabulum abnormally or does not permit a normal range of motion in the acetabular socket. Damage can occur to the articular cartilage, or labral cartilage (soft tissue, ring-shaped bumper of the socket), or both. The condition may be symptomatic or asymptomatic. It may cause osteoarthritis of the hip.

Treatment options range from conservative to surgery.

== Signs and symptoms ==
Pain is the most common complaint in those with FAI. It is experienced in a number of areas, making the diagnosis challenging, but commonly occurs in the groin, upper buttock/lower back, the buttock or beneath the buttock, side of the affected hip and posterior upper leg. Onset of symptoms has been reported to present in both an acute and more gradual manner. The pain is often significant enough to cause a decrease in activity level and movement. Some will also describe decreased range of motion of the affected hip. Another symptom is groin pain associated with activity and no prior history of trauma. Inability to perform activities such as high hip flexion or prolong sitting can also be seen in individuals with FAI.

== Cause ==
FAI is characterized by abnormal contact between the proximal femur and rim of the acetabulum (hip socket). In most cases, patients present with a deformity in the femoral head, or acetabulum, a poorly positioned femoral-acetabular junction, or any or all of the foregoing. The cause of FAI is currently unknown, but both congenital and acquired etiologies have been put forth. Studies have shown an increased incidence in siblings, suggesting a genetic component. At least one study has also shown a predilection in the white population. It has also been reported to be more common in males. However, there is no concrete evidence to suggest a genetic trait and instead, the most favored theory currently supports that FAI (the cam type in particular) is due to repetitive movements involving the hip (e.g. squatting) in young athletes. Aggravating activities that are commonly reported include repetitive or prolonged squatting, twisting movements of the hip, like pivoting during athletics, getting in and out of cars, and even sitting for prolonged periods. A combination of these factors may also predispose to a form of FAI; predominantly, a marginal developmental hip abnormality together with environmental factors such as recurrent motion of the legs within a supraphysiologic range.

Three types of FAI are recognized (see title image). The first involves an excess of bone along the upper surface of the femoral head, known as a cam deformity (abbreviation for camshaft, which the shape of the femoral head and neck resembles). The second is due to an excess of growth of the upper lip of the acetabular cup and is known as a 'pincer' deformity. The third is a combination of the two, generally referred to as 'mixed.' The most common type seen, approximately 70% of the time, is the mixed type. A complicating issue is that some of the radiographic findings of FAI have also been described in asymptomatic subjects.

Current literature suggests that the cam type of impingement is associated with the development of hip osteoarthritis. Thus far, no correlation has been seen between the pincer type and development of hip osteoarthritis.

== Anatomy ==
The hip joint is classified as a ball and socket joint. This type of synovial joint allows for multidirectional movement and rotation. There are two bones that make up the hip joint and create an articulation between the femur and pelvis. This articulation connects the axial skeleton with the lower extremity. The pelvic bone, also known as the innominate bone, is formed by three bones fused together: the ilium, ischium, and pubis. The musculature of the hip is divided into anterior hip muscles and posterior hip muscles. The major nerve supply that runs through the hip joint is the femoral nerve and the sciatic nerve.

== Diagnosis ==
Clinical evaluation is the first step in diagnosis, but will rarely lead to the diagnosis on its own, due to inconsistent and vague nature of the pain. Childhood and current activity should be inquired about. Physical exam should also involve assessing passive internal rotation of the hip during flexion, as range of motion is reduced in proportion to the size of a cam lesion. Flexing the hip to 90 degrees, adducting, and internally rotating the hip, known as the FADDIR test, should also be performed. It is positive when it causes pain. The FABER test should also be performed, this test involves flexing, abducting, and externally rotating the hip. The FABER test is useful when diagnosing concurrently with a labral pathology and is considered positive if the position elicits pain. Additional non-invasive ways to observe possible FAI is changes in gait that include a lower peak hip extension and internal rotation to compensate for bony growth.

=== X-ray ===
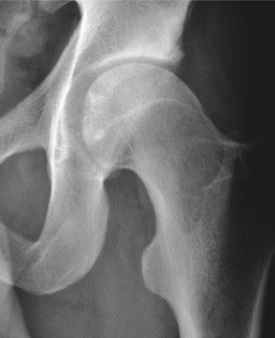
Radiograph of a cam type impingement.

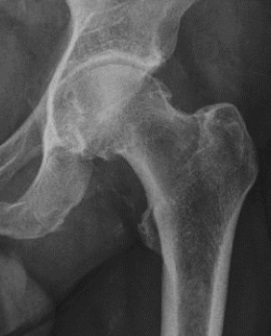
Radiograph of a pincer type impingement.

Projectional radiography ("X-ray") is often considered first line for FAI. Anterior-posterior pelvis and a lateral image of the hip in question should be attained. A 45-degree Dunn view is also recommended.

Measurements of impingement on X-ray. (Note: Unless otherwise specified in boxes, reference is the one marked in header.)
Measurement	Image	Target	Normal value
Center-edge angle of Wiberg		The superior-lateral coverage of the femoral head.	>20° (<55 years old) (Note: This can also be used in children. At between 5 and 10 years, the minimum normal value is 15°.); <24° (>55 years old); >40° indicates overcoverage
Crossing ratio		Percentage of acetabular walls crossing. Normal acetabulum is oriented in anteversion. Its value ranges from 15 to 20° in the equatorial plane of the acetabulum and decreases gradually towards the acetabular roof, where normal values range from 0 to 5°. Retroversion of the upper part of the acetabulum has been related with pincer type impingement. In radiography the presence of a "crossover sign" is produced when the posterior wall of the acetabulum crosses the anterior wall before reaching the acetabular roof. It is a sign of acetabular retroversion and it has been linked with overcoverage and pincer impingement. Nevertheless, this sign has been described in 6% of the normal population. Therefore, more important than its presence is the percentage of crossing.	<20%: Higher is significant crossing
Alpha angle	Measured in 45° Dunn view.	Degree of bulging of the femoral head-neck junction: In normal conditions there is a symmetric concave contour at the junction of the femoral head and neck. Loss of this concavity or bone bulging may lead to cam type impingement. The degree of this deformity can be measured by the alpha angle. Although it can be measured in the cross-lateral view, the 45° Dunn view is considered more sensitive and the frog leg view more specific in determining pathologic values.	Normal: ≤68° in men, ≤50° in women; Borderline: 69° to 82° in men, 51° to 56° in women; Pathological: ≥83° in men and ≥57° in women
Femoral head-neck offset	Measured in cross-lateral view.	Offset of the femoral head with regard to most prominent aspect of the femora neck	>10 mm
Offset percentage	Measured in cross-lateral view.	Femoral head-neck offset related to femoral head diameter	>0.18: less indicates high risk of cam type impingement
Tönnis angle		Slope of the sourcil (the sclerotic weight-bearing portion of the acetabulum)	0 to 10°: >10° is a risk factor for instability; <0° is a risk factor for pincer impingement
Caput-sourcil angle		Superior to the Tönnis angle in cases without joint space narrowing or subluxation. The medial point of the sourcil is at the same height as the most superior point of caput femoris.	−6 to 12°: >12° is a risk factor for instability; <-6° is a risk factor for pincer impingement

=== Other modalities ===
MRI imaging may follow, particularly if there is no specific evidence on radiographs, producing a three-dimensional reconstruction of the joint for better definition, to evaluate the hip cartilage, or measure hip socket angles (e.g. the alpha-angle as described by Nötzli in 2-D and by Siebenrock in 3-D). MR arthrogram had been used in the past, as it was more sensitive for picking up soft tissue lesions; however, due to improvement in technology, MRI is now considered comparable for picking up such lesions. CT is not usually used due to radiation exposure and no benefit above MRI. It is possible to perform dynamic simulation of hip motion with CT or MRI assisting to establish whether, where, and to what extent, impingement is occurring.

The diagnosis is often made in conjunction with a labral tear.

=== Differential ===
Other conditions that may appear similar include:

- Piriformis syndrome or strain
- Labral tear without FAI
- Adductor muscle strain
- Sciatica
- Athletic pubalgia
- Gluteus medius/minimus or illiopsoas tendinopathy
- Stress fracture
- Femoral head osteonecrosis
- Other impingements, including anterior inferior iliac spine, ischiofemoral and iliopsoas
- Loose body in the joint (intra-articular body)

== Prevention ==
Prevention is currently being investigated. The goal of prevention would be to avoid joint damage and premature hip osteoarthritis. Studies are examining the effectiveness of screening adolescents in school and targeting at-risk individuals for education, physical therapy and decreasing participation in possibly harmful activities/sports as referenced in the epidemiology section.

== Treatment ==
Treatment of FAI can be divided into those that are non-operative (conservative) and operative. Conservative treatment is often prescribed for those who have not yet received any therapy. Conservative treatment includes physical therapy, avoidance of those activities that produce pain, and nonsteroidal anti-inflammatory drugs. It may also include joint injections with cortisone or hyaluronic acid, particularly for those who wish to avoid surgery.

Physical therapy is implemented for the purpose of improving joint mobility, strengthening muscles surrounding the joint, correcting posture, and treating any other muscle or joint deficits that may be exacerbating the condition. A movement analysis may also be performed to identify specific movement patterns that may be causing injury. Studies to demonstrate the effectiveness of physical therapy are currently underway, with no conclusive results to date.

Operative treatment is generally recommended to those who continue to have symptoms. It involves the surgical correction of any bony abnormalities causing the impingement and correction of any soft tissue lesions, such as labral tears. The primary aim of surgery is to correct the fit of the femoral head and acetabulum to create a hip socket that reduces contact between the two, allowing a greater range of movement. This includes femoral head sculpting and/or trimming of the acetabular rim.

Surgery may be arthroscopic or open. A 2011 study analyzing current surgical methods for management of symptomatic femoral acetabular impingement, suggested that the arthroscopic method had surgical outcomes equal to or better than other methods with a lower rate of major complications when performed by experienced surgeons; consequently, the surgery is now rarely done open.

Outcomes of arthroscopic surgery are currently being studied, but have generally been positive. According to a 2019 meta-analysis, the risk of having surgery fail or need to be re-operated on is about 5.5% whereas the complication rate is 1.7%. Additionally, patient reported outcomes show that approximately three to six months post-operative hip arthroscopy is when pain reduction and activities of daily life are improved. For sport function this timeline is about six months to a year. Failure of hip arthroscopy is more likely to fail in older patients, females, or those who have experienced the symptoms of FAI for a long period of time.

When performed on elite athletes, most are able to return their previous level of competition. These athletes also have a higher rate of return to sport than recreational and collegiate athletes.

Long term, randomized controlled trials evaluating the efficacy of conservative and operative treatments are underway.

== Epidemiology ==
There has been limited research on the prevalence of FAI among a general population according to a literature review by Algarni. On the other hand, there are many sources that discuss the prevalence of athletes with the condition especially those that are younger and white. Hockey, tennis, soccer, and equestrian are all sports where the prevalence of a femoral neck abnormalities are higher due to the nature of the sport to force athletes into forced, loaded flexion and internal rotation.

Cam lesions are more common in males, where pincer lesions are more common in females due to differences in anatomical development of the pelvis.

== History ==
FAI is a relatively recent discovery. Its original description is credited to orthopedic surgeon Dr. Reinhold Ganz, who first proposed the condition as a cause for hip osteoarthritis in a publication in 2003.

While the true diagnosis of FAI can be considered a relatively recent discovery, reports of damage to the femoroacetabular region date back over a century ago in the orthopedic realm of medicine. It was not until the development of an open surgical dislocation procedure was developed that FAI was discovered as an anatomical difference and cause of osteoarthritis. Orthopedic surgeon Dr. Reinhold Ganz can be credited with this discovery in his 2003 publication that discussed the findings and relation to hip osteoarthritis.

== Society and culture ==
Notable persons who have had hip impingement:

- Zach Banner (born 1993), American NFL football offensive tackle for the Pittsburgh Steelers
- Michelle Kwan, American figure skater
- Oscar Hiljemark, Swedish footballer
- Greg Holland, American baseball player
- Devin Mesoraco, American baseball player
- Charlie Morton, American baseball player
- Andy Murray, British tennis player
- Greg Norman, Australian golfer
- Alex Rodriguez, American baseball player
- Isaiah Thomas, American basketball player
