= Iliopectineal bursa =

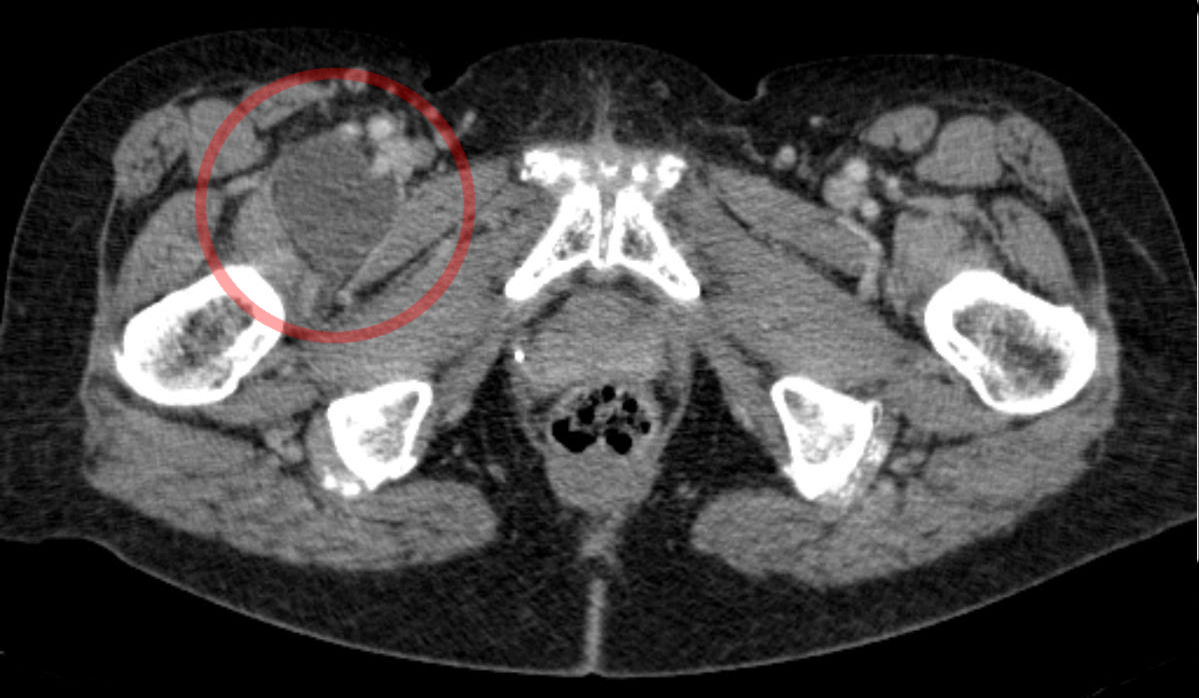
- Enlarged iliopectineal bursa in CT - scan

Details

Identifiers
- Latin: Bursa iliopectinea
- TA98: A04.8.05.011
- TA2: 2732
- FMA: 75385

The iliopectineal bursa or the iliopsoas bursa is a large synovial bursa that separates the external surface of the hip joint capsule from the tendon of the iliopsoas muscle.

The most proximal of part the iliopectineal bursa lies on the iliopubic eminence of the superior pubic ramus. The iliopectineal bursa passes across the front of the capsule of the hip joint and extends distally downwards almost as far as the lesser trochanter.

The iliopectineal bursa frequently communicates by a circular aperture with the cavity of the hip joint.

In 13% of all cases the iliopectineal bursa is partly separated by a septum into two cavities. Here the tendon of the psoas major muscle passes over the medial chamber and the tendon of the iliacus muscle runs over the lateral chamber.

Inflammation of the iliopectineal bursa is called iliopectineal bursitis or iliopsoas bursitis.
