= Pointe technique =

Ballet technique for dancing on the tips of toes

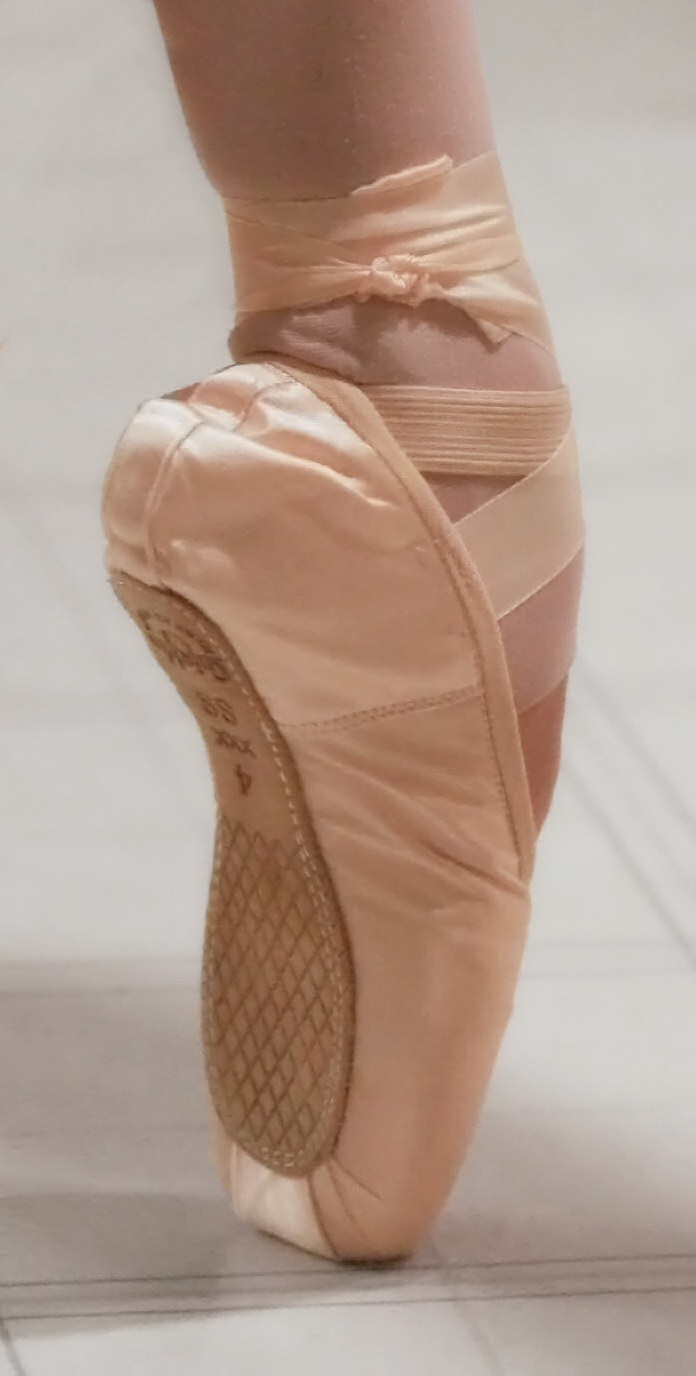
En pointe foot in a pointe shoe

Pointe technique (/pwænt/ pwant) is part of classical ballet involving a technique that concerns pointe work, in which a ballet dancer supports all body weight on the tips of fully extended feet when wearing pointe shoes. A dancer is said to be en pointe (/ɒ̃-, ɒn-, ɑːn ˈpwænt/) when the body is supported in this manner, and a fully extended vertical foot is said to be en pointe when touching the floor, even when not bearing weight.

Pointe technique resulted from a desire for female dancers to appear weightless and sylph-like. Although both men and women are capable of pointe work, it is most often performed by women. Extensive training and practice are required to develop the strength and technique needed for pointe work. Typically, dance teachers consider factors such as age, experience, strength and alignment when deciding whether to allow a dancer to begin pointe work.

== Technique ==
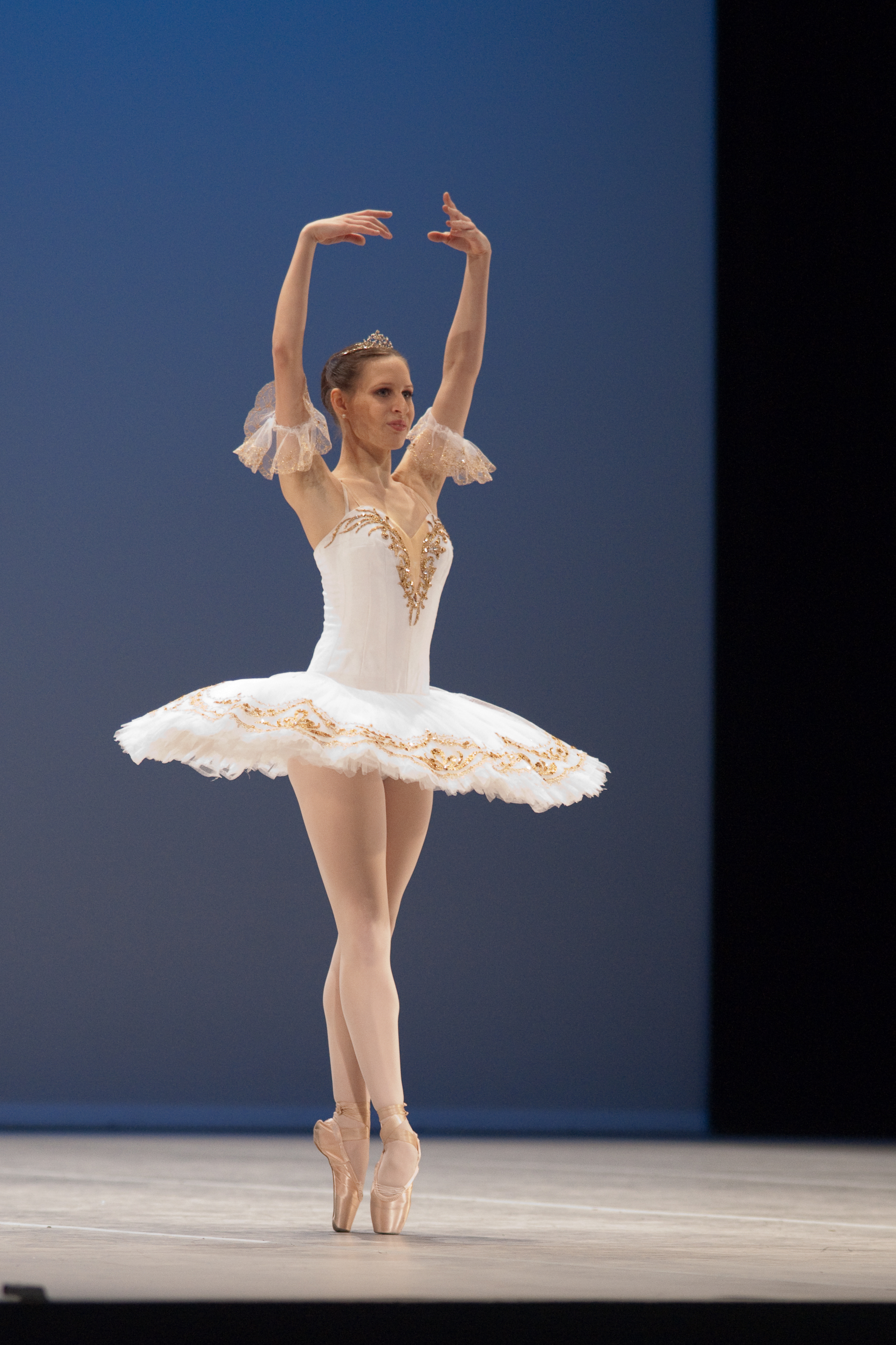
Body alignment and foot placement are fundamental aspects of pointe technique, as illustrated by this en pointe dancer

Pointe technique encompasses both the mechanical and artistic aspects of pointe work. In particular, it is concerned with body alignment, placement of the feet and the manner in which a dancer transitions to and from en pointe. A dancer is said to have "good" or "proper" technique when in conformance with the best practices of pointe technique, which in turn are generally referred to as proper technique.

=== Placement and alignment ===
En pointe dancers employ pointe technique to determine foot placement and body alignment. When exhibiting proper technique, a dancer's en pointe foot is placed so that the instep is fully stretched with toes perpendicular to the floor, and the pointe shoe's platform (the flattened tip of the toe box) is square to the floor, so that a substantial part of its surface is contacting the floor.

Proper technique is also evident from a dancer's body alignment, by visualizing a straight line that extends from the center of the hip through the toes. When a properly aligned dancer is viewed from the side, the line passes through the knee, ankle joint and big toe joints. When viewed from the front, the line passes through the knee, ankle joint and the joints of the second toe or middle toe or the area between those toe joints. In cases of unusually high instep or metatarsal joint flexibility, it is sometimes necessary to flex the toes to achieve proper alignment.

=== Movement into en pointe ===
A dancer may transition to en pointe by any of three possible methods: relevé, sauté or piqué. In the relevé method, the dancer rises smoothly by rotating the foot downward until it reaches a fully extended, vertical orientation while the toe box remains in contact with the floor, thus "rolling up" on the foot. This may be done either gradually or rapidly, on one foot or both feet, beginning with feet flat on the floor or in demi-pointe (heels raised). In the sauté method, the dancer springs up and lands en pointe. In the process, the feet break contact with the floor and the dancer is briefly airborne. To transition to en pointe via piqué, a dancer will step out directly onto a fully extended, vertical foot. The other foot is then raised from the floor, thereby leaving the dancer en pointe.

Modern ballet technique incorporates all three transition methods. Relevé and piqué transitions are typically used for adages, where strength, poise and controlled movements are highlighted. The more abrupt sauté method, which was introduced by Enrico Cecchetti, is typically used in allegros, where the relatively slow and smooth relevé and piqué transitions would be both impractical and visually inconsistent with the lively pace of movement. The sauté method is more common in Russian ballet.

== Training ==
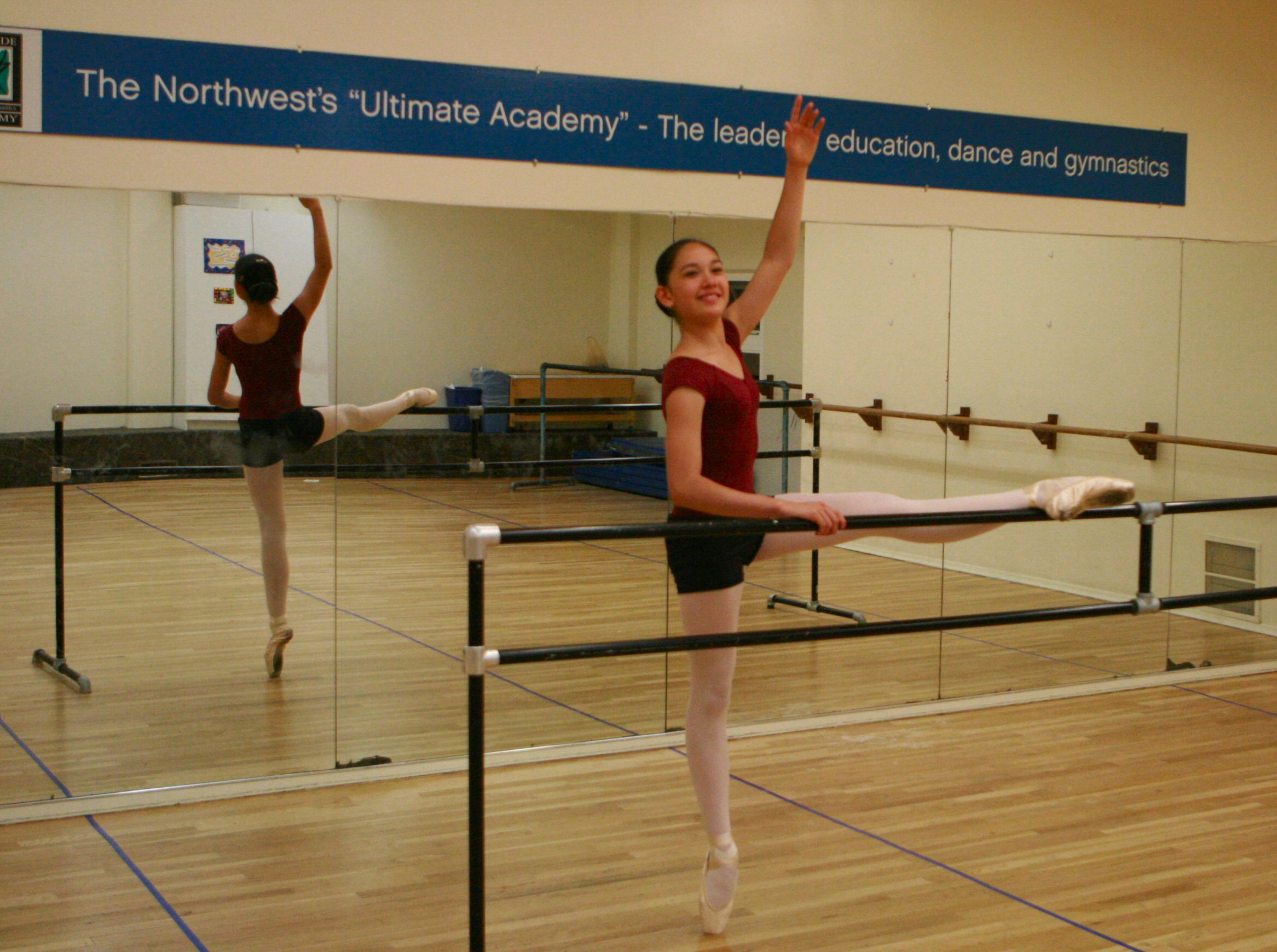
Ballet dancer performing barre exercises

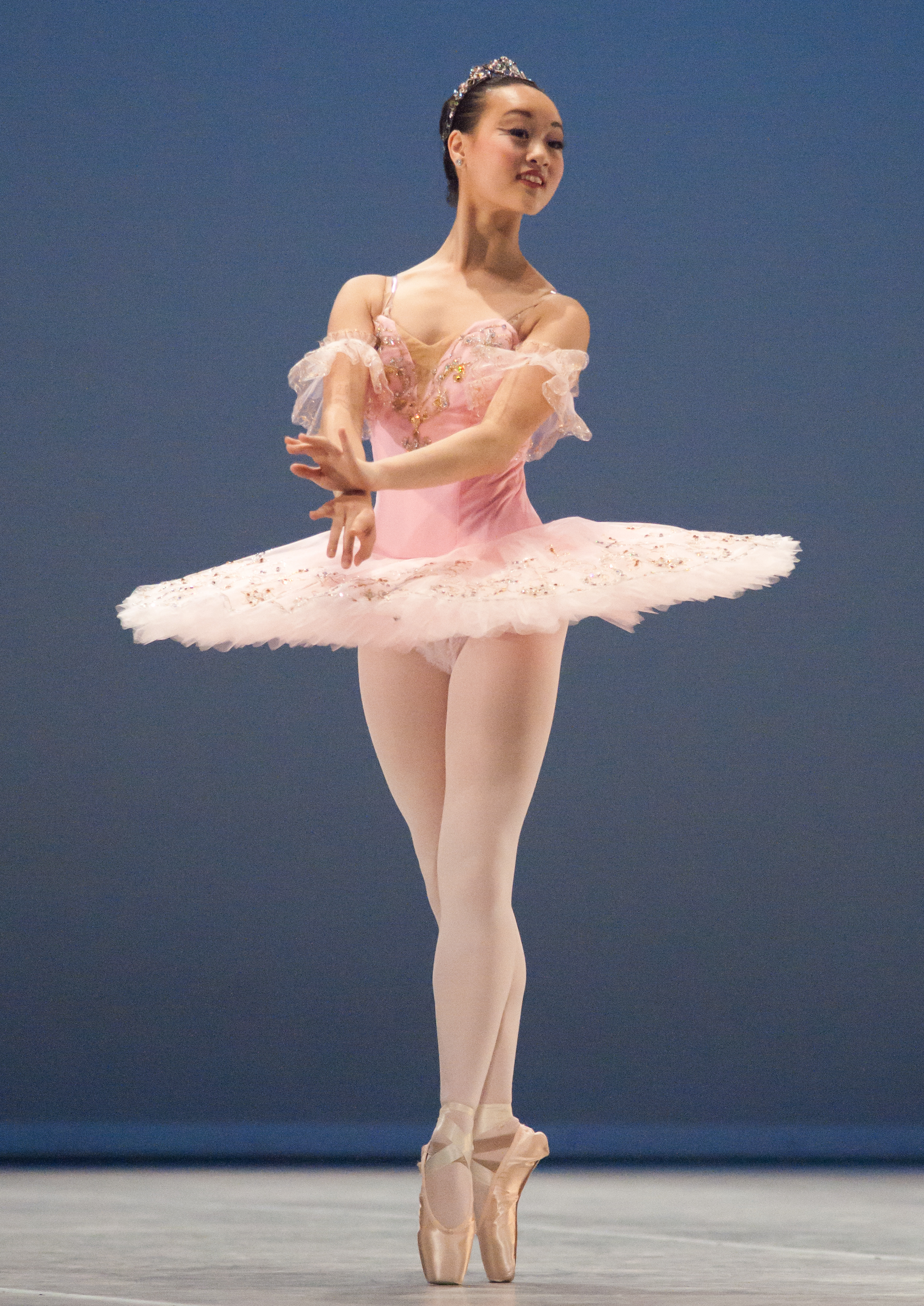

=== Prerequisites ===
Although age is not necessarily a prerequisite, many ballet students do not begin to dance en pointe earlier than approximately 12–14 years of age because bones in the feet are often too soft prior to that age and in such cases serious and permanent foot injuries could result from starting pointe work too early. While some students start pointe work at the age of ten or eleven, this should only be practised by highly accomplished and experienced students. The long bones in feet begin to harden between the ages of 8 and 14; dancing en pointe before one's bones have hardened can lead to trauma and growth-plate fractures that create deformed feet.

Exceptions may be made if a physician has determined that a dancer's feet have sufficiently ossified, and it is not uncommon for dancers to begin pointe work as early as age nine. Oftentimes, dance studios require their students to have their feet x-rayed, and for their physician to verify whether the student's feet are ready for pointe work.

Another key determining factor is strength in the legs, feet, ankles and core. Without strong ankles, feet and legs dancers are likely to hurt themselves once en pointe or be too weak to remain en pointe for the duration of a routine. Strong core strength ensures the dancer maintains their center and prevents them from rolling their feet when dancing en pointe.

Otherwise ballet students are generally ready to begin pointe work after achieving competency in fundamental ballet technique and have been dancing for a number of years. For example, before learning pointe work, a dancer must be able to maintain turnout while performing center combinations, hold a proper ballet position with straight back and good turnout, pull up properly in the legs, and balance securely in a relevé that is perpendicular to the floor.

=== Preparation (pre-pointe classes) ===
Preparation for pointe work is a gradual process that begins with barre exercises to develop the requisite strength in ankles, feet, legs and core often known as pre-pointe classes. These exercises may vary in accordance with a teacher's preferences and if applicable, the training method's syllabus. The first exercises at the barre are usually relevés, échappés, pliés, port de bras and tendus. When the student is comfortable executing these steps on both feet and sufficiently strong, steps ending on one en pointe foot are introduced such as pas de bourrée and retiré.

During each class session, a student will move on to centre exercises after completing the barre work. These exercises emphasize various aspects of ballet technique such as: turnout, pointing of the feet, and the use of ballet technique while en pointe.

Dancers typically take pre-pointe lessons for a year before they are allowed to get pointe shoes. However, it is at the discretion of the dance instructor to determine if one year of pre-pointe is sufficient or if the dancer needs more time to prepare. Hence, it is quite common for students to take two or even three years of pre-pointe in order to properly assimilate all the material required for pointe.

== Health risks and injury prevention ==
Dancing en pointe stresses the feet in various ways and thus can potentially cause injuries if the dancer does not plan ahead or take into account health and safety concerns. Injuries can result from improper technique, poorly fitting pointe shoes, and lack of effective cushioning and accessories. Some types of injuries are prevented by adhering to proper technique such as: correct upper-body positioning, maintaining straight knees when required, keeping body weight centered over the box of the shoes, and avoiding sickling. Problems dealing with technique can be easily fixed by proper training and one-on-one interactions with the dance instructor to improve the dancer's technique.

Injuries due to toe misalignment are often avoided by adjusting toe alignments with gel toe spacers. Toenail bruising can be caused by heavy pressure on the surface of the nail. This is typically prevented by keeping toenails clipped short, by wrapping tape around the toes, by using padding, or combinations of these. Bruising can also occur on the tips of the toes, especially when no padding is used. It is highly unadvised to dance en pointe without padding.

Pointe work can cause friction between toes and the interior of the pointe shoe's box. This friction, under the high pressure of much of the dancer's body weight, can result in chafing and blistering. This is often mitigated with lambswool or toe pads or by wrapping tape around toes or use gel pads that can conform to any one problem area. Choosing between cloth and gel, gel, only cloth, wool, etc. for toe pads is a personal preference for each dancer, but each style has its own benefits.

Other exterior injuries include cuts caused by toenails piercing adjacent toes. This can be prevented by keeping toe nails cut short and filed smooth. Also, calluses may form on the bottoms and sides of the feet, which can crack open. This can be helped by the use of gel pad protectors on specific problem spots or using pads to surround the toes. Ingrown nails can result from ill-fitting shoes.

Ultimately, dancing on the tips of the toes is unnatural, painful and potentially harmful. Every other activity of the human foot, walking, running, jumping, has been part of its evolutionary journey from arboreal to bipedal locomotion - dancing en pointe has not. Further, pointe shoes are symmetrical, there are no lefts and rights. The toes have to flex inwards to conform to the tapered shape of the toe box. Pressure of the body weight on the toes in this misaligned position may, with other factors, contribute to the development of bunions.

Other common injuries:

- Deformities such as bunions, bunionettes, and hammer toes
- Inflammations such as bursitis and sesamoiditis
- Dancer's heel (Plantar fasciitis), a tightening of the instep tendon that causes discomfort in the instep and heel
- Sprained ankles
- Stress fractures
- Achilles tendinitis and extensor tendinitis
