= Zona orbicularis =

Ligament of the hip

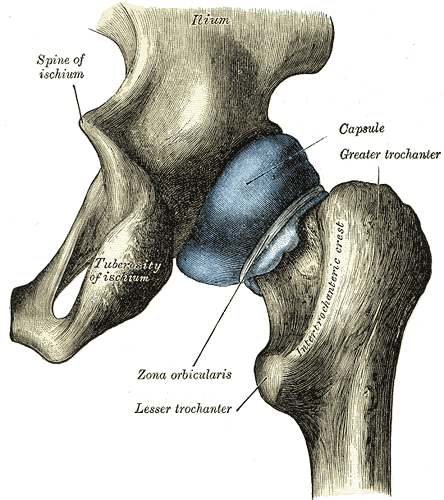
- Capsule of hip-joint (distended). Posterior aspect. (Zona orbicularis labeled at center bottom.)

Details

Identifiers
- Latin: zona orbicularis articulationis coxae
- TA98: A03.6.07.002
- TA2: 1874
- FMA: 42960

The zona orbicularis or annular ligament is a ligament on the neck of the femur formed by the circular fibers of the articular capsule of the hip joint. It is also known as the orbicular zone, ring ligament, and zonular band.

== Structure ==
The zona orbicularis forms a ring around the neck of the femur. The articular capsule is much thicker above and in front of the joint, where the greatest amount of resistance is required, and thin and loose behind and below the joint.

The capsule consists of two sets of fibers, circular and longitudinal. The circular fibers, the zona orbicularis, are most abundant at the lower and back part of the capsule where they form a sling or collar around the femoral neck. Anteriorly, they blend with the deep surface of the iliofemoral ligament, and gain an attachment to the anterior inferior iliac spine.

== Function ==
The zona orbicularis and proximal hip joint capsule are poorly understood. Recent studies seem to confirm that the proximal to middle part of the articular capsule, including the zona orbicularis, acts biomechanically as a locking ring wrapped around the femoral neck and thus is a key structure for hip stability in distraction. It tightens the joint capsule of the hip when iliopsoas muscle contracts.

== Additional images ==
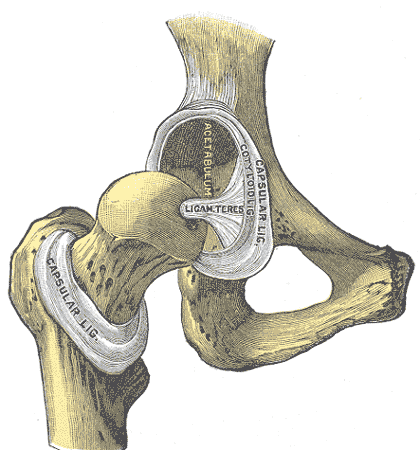
Front view of hip joint with capsular ligament largely removed

Zona orbicularis used as arthroscopic landmark for iliopsoas muscle.
