= Ballet technique =

Principles of body movement and form in ballet

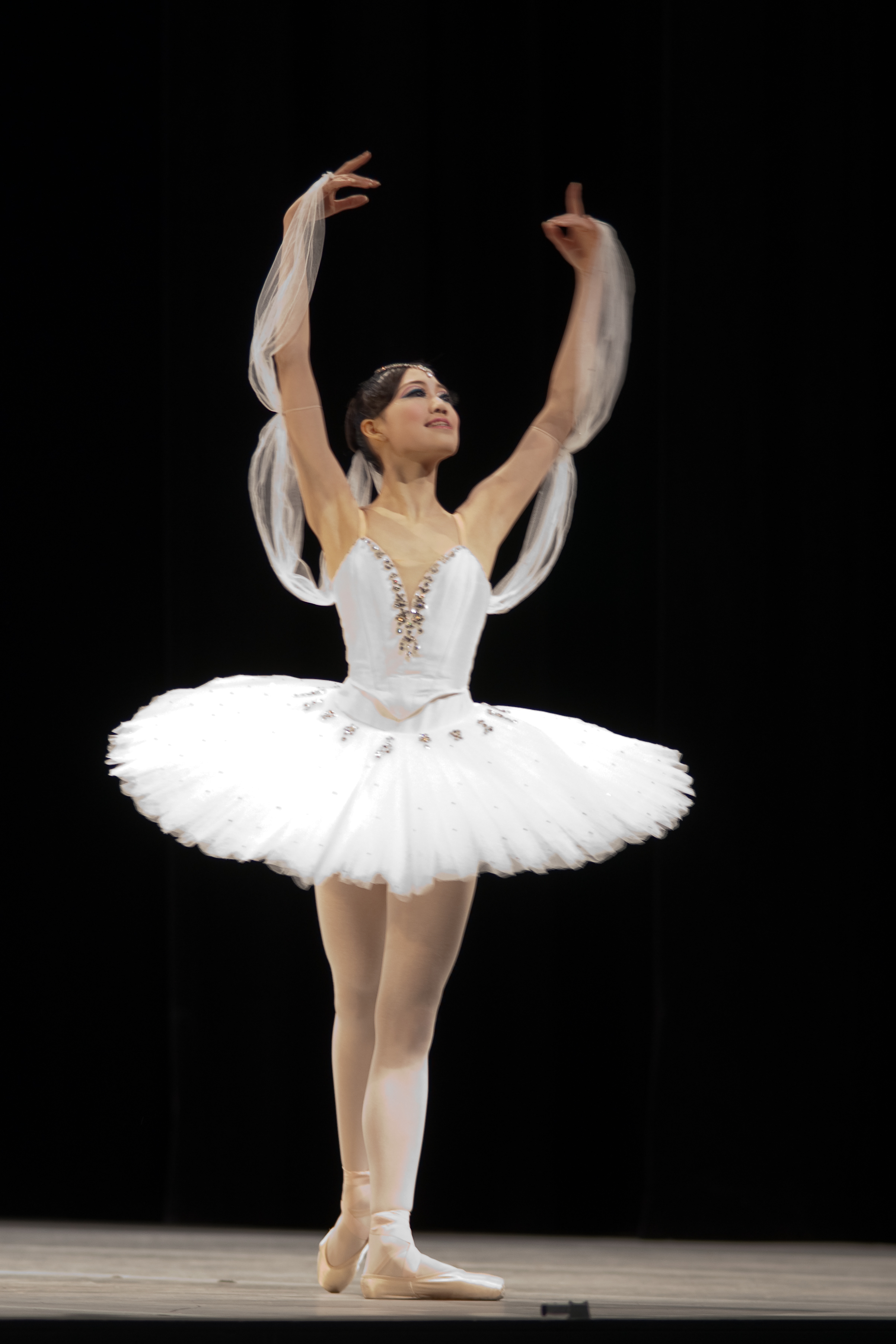

Ballet technique is the foundational principles of body movement and form used in ballet. It is an important aspect of ballet performance because ballet (especially classical ballet) puts great emphasis on the method and execution of movement. The techniques found in classical ballet are a framework for many other styles of dance, including jazz and contemporary ballet.

Aspects of ballet technique include alignment, which refers to keeping the head, shoulders, and hips vertically aligned. Turnout refers to completing movements with legs rotated outward; this promotes clean footwork, graceful port de bras (movement of the arms), and correct body positions, lines and angles. Other aspects of ballet technique include posture, toe pointing, keeping shoulders down, and pulling up, which combines proper posture and lifting of the muscles to increase turnout and enhance alignment and thus improve the quality of turns. Ballet technique is also used to exhibit ballon, the appearance of gravity-defying lightness, during leaps. Pointe technique is the part of ballet technique concerned with dancing on the tips of fully extended feet.

The core techniques of ballet are common throughout the world, though there are minor variations among the different styles of ballet. Together with stylistic differences, these variations produce an aesthetic and physicality of performance that is unique to each style. For example, Russian ballet exhibits high extensions and dynamic turns, whereas Italian ballet tends to be more grounded, with a focus on fast and intricate footwork.

== Training ==
Ballet training places great emphasis on ballet technique because precise technique is an essential element of the aesthetics of ballet performance. Ballet technique is drilled into ballet students to develop the desired aesthetics and to prevent injury. For example, students are taught to avoid sickling of the foot, which is an undesirable aesthetic and can result in ankle injuries when performing en pointe.

The ballet barre is a tool for learning ballet technique. Barre work typically involves all elements of ballet technique except for the elements that are exclusive to jumps. It is possible to practice turning technique for fouettés and pirouettes at the barre.

== Applications ==
- Petit allegro (meaning "small and fast") movements comprise small jumps and fast, detailed footwork.
- Grand allegro (meaning "big and fast") movements comprise technically challenging movements such as large jumps and leaps.

== See also ==
- Glossary of ballet
