= Intertrochanteric line =

Part of the femur

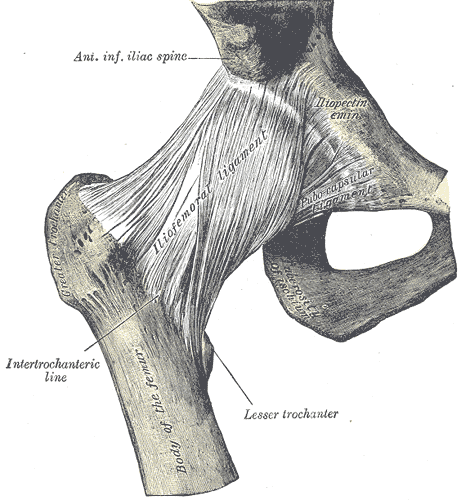
- Right hip-joint from the front. (Intertrochanteric line labeled at bottom left.)

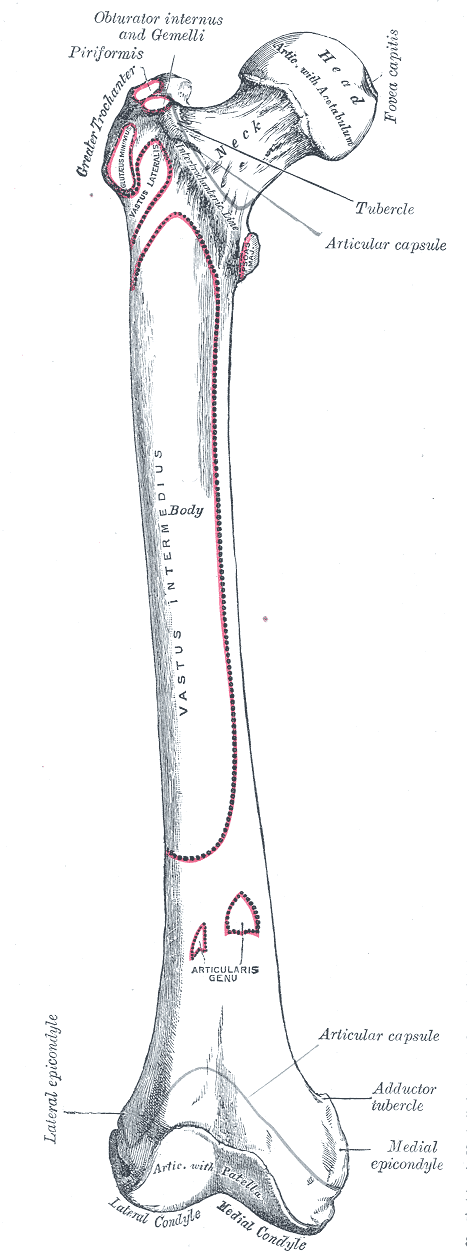
- Right femur. Anterior surface. (Intertrochanteric line visible near top, as diagonal line below neck.)

Details

Identifiers
- Latin: linea intertrochanterica
- TA98: A02.5.04.009
- TA2: 1368
- FMA: 74587

The intertrochanteric line is a line upon the anterior aspect of the proximal end of the femur, extending between the lesser trochanter and the greater trochanter. It is a rough, variable ridge.

== Structure ==
The intertrochanteric line marks the boundary between the femoral neck and shaft anteriorly (whereas the intertrochanteric crest marks the same boundary posteriorly).

=== Attachments ===
The iliofemoral ligament — the largest ligament of the human body — attaches above the line. The lower half, less prominent than the upper half, gives origin to the upper part of the vastus medialis.

The distal capsular attachment on the femur follows the shape of the irregular rim between the head and the neck. As a consequence, the capsule of the hip joint attaches in the region of the intertrochanteric line on the anterior side, but a finger away from the intertrochanteric crest on the posterior side of the head.

The fibers of the ischiocapsular ligament attach both into the joint capsule and onto the intertrochanteric line.

== Clinical significance ==
=== Intertrochantric fractures ===
This area of the femur being an important pillar for weight bearing through the skeletal system is subject to comparatively high levels of dynamic stress, pathological strain, physiological strain and trauma. This area is prone to fractures due to high velocity trauma in the young and trivial trauma in the elderly. The fractures in this line are called intertrochantric fractures and are classified as per the pattern of the fracture geometry.

After a fracture this area of bone is notorious for uniting in varying, and sometimes problematic angles. Therefore, it typically requires early surgical reduction and fixation with early mobilization and weight bearing in order to facilitate enhanced recovery.
