= Iliopsoas bursitis =

Iliopsoas bursitis is inflammation of a bursa (synovial sac) lying between the iliopsoas muscle and hip joint, lateral to femoral vessels. Pain is experienced over the same area and made worse by extension of hip joint.
