= Turnout (ballet) =

Ballet position

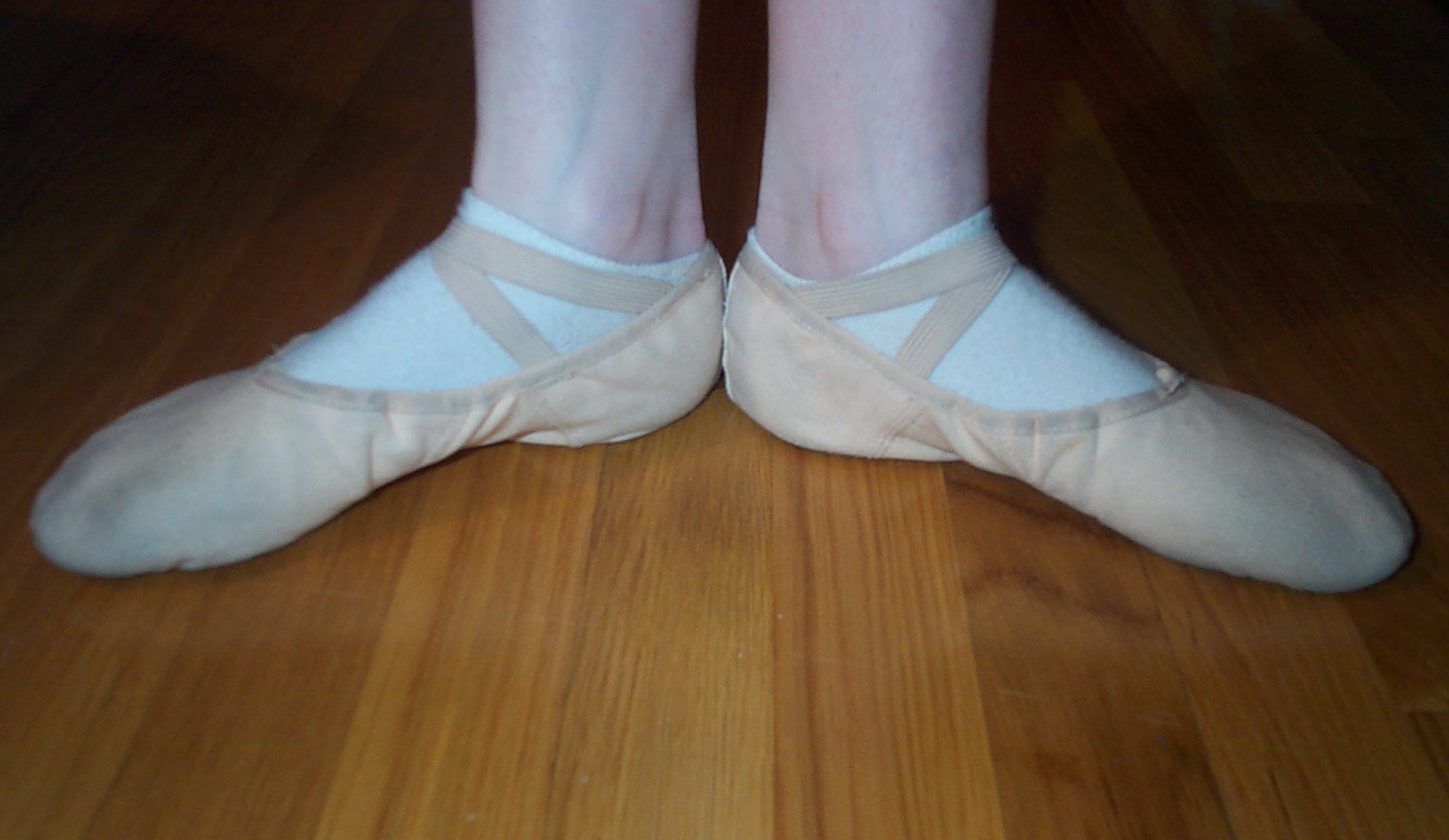
First position of the feet turned out

In ballet, turnout (also turn-out) is rotation of the leg at the hips which causes the feet (and knees) to turn outward, away from the front of the body. This rotation allows for greater extension of the leg, especially when raising it to the side and rear. Turnout is an essential part of classical ballet technique.

Turnout is measured in terms of the angle between the center lines of the feet when heels are touching, as in first position. Complete turnout (a 180° angle) is rarely attainable without conditioning. Various exercises are used to improve turnout by increasing hip flexibility (to improve movement range), strengthening buttocks muscles (to enable a dancer to maintain turnout), or both.

== Physiology ==
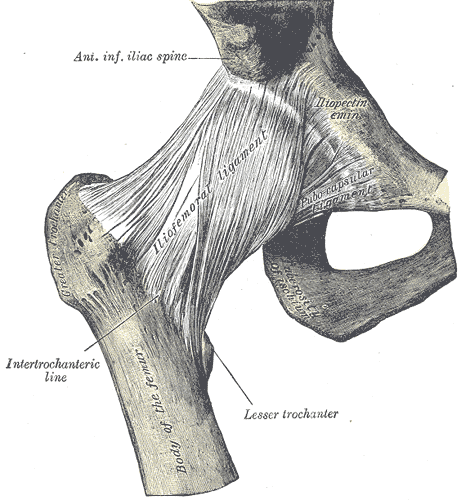
The elasticity of the iliofemoral ligament (at center) is important for turnout.

In properly executed turnout, the legs must rotate at the hips. If turnout is achieved via lateral rotation in the knee joint (vs. at the hip), the knee will still face forward. This is considered to be less aesthetically pleasing and can cause knee injury.

Some dancers will use an anterior pelvic tilt (shortening the hip flexors) because hip flexion reduces the tension on the ligament and allows lateral hip rotation to occur more easily. This will however, affect the dancer's posture, since it requires the back to hyper-extend to remain upright.

The extent to which an individual can rotate their legs is largely predetermined. The degree of turnout attainable is determined by the shape of the femoral neck and the angle at which the femoral head is inserted into the hip socket, the orientation of the hip socket, the elasticity of the iliofemoral ligament, and the flexibility of the hip and thigh muscles. However, the structure of the bone may be influenced by ballet exercises before a certain period of bone development attained around the age of eleven.

== See also ==
- Health risks of professional dance
