= Pubofemoral ligament =

Ligament of the hip

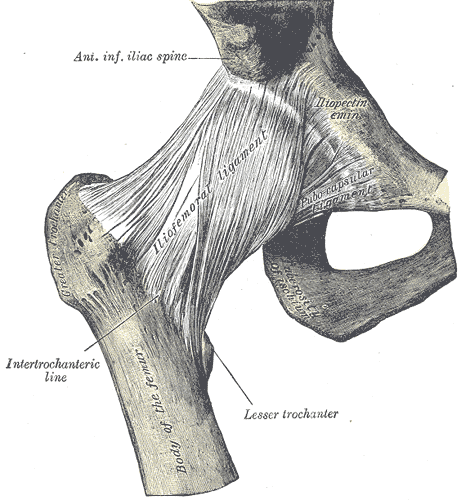
- Right hip-joint from the front. (Pubocapsular ligament visible at center right.)

Details

Identifiers
- Latin: ligamentum pubofemorale
- TA98: A03.6.07.007
- TA2: 1879
- FMA: 43024

The pubofemoral ligament (or pubocapsular ligament) is a ligament which reinforces the inferior and anterior portions of the joint capsule of the hip joint. The ligament attaches superiorly at the superior ramus of pubis, and the iliopubic eminence; it attaches inferiorly at the inferior portion of the intertrochanteric line (here blending with the inferior band of iliofemoral ligament). The psoas bursa intervenes between the ligament and joint capsule.

The ligament resists hyper-abduction of the hip joint.
