= Iliofemoral ligament =

Attaches hip to femur

Iliofemoral
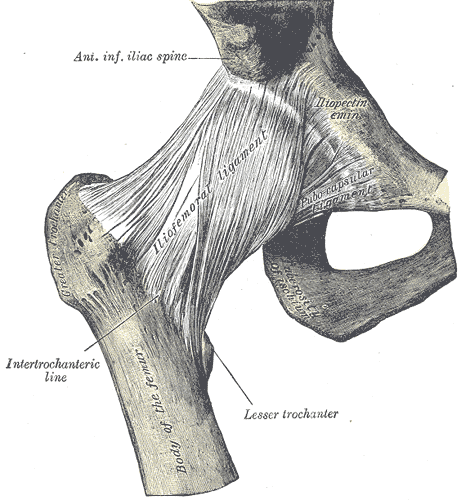
- Right hip-joint from the front. (Iliofemoral ligament visible at center.)

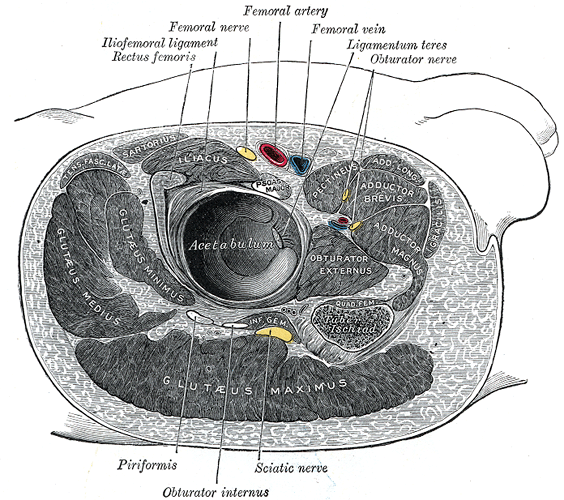
- Structures surrounding right hip-joint. (Iliofemoral ligament labeled at upper left.)

Details
- From: ilium (anterior inferior iliac spine)
- To: femur (intertrochanteric line)

Identifiers
- Latin: ligamentum iliofemorale
- TA98: A03.6.07.003
- TA2: 1875
- FMA: 42993

The iliofemoral ligament is a thick and very tough triangular capsular ligament of the hip joint situated anterior to this joint. It attaches superiorly at the inferior portion of the anterior inferior iliac spine and adjacent portion of the margin of the acetabulum; it attaches inferiorly at the intertrochanteric line.

It is also referred to as the Y-ligament (see below). the ligament of Bigelow, the ligament of Bertin and any combinations of these names.

With a force strength exceeding 350 kg (772 lbs), the iliofemoral ligament is not only stronger than the two other ligaments of the hip joint, the ischiofemoral and the pubofemoral, but also the strongest ligament in the human body and as such is an important constraint to the hip joint.

== Structure ==
The ligament is triangular in shape, with its apex represented by its pelvic attachment. The ligament has two though outer bands; it is thinner and weaker centrally. As the lateral portion is twisted like a screw, the two parts together take the form of an inverted Y.

Arising from the anterior inferior iliac spine and the rim of the acetabulum, the iliofemoral ligament spreads obliquely downwards and laterally to the intertrochanteric line on the anterior side of the femoral head. It is divided into two parts or bands which act differently: the transverse part above, is strong and runs parallel to the axis of the femoral neck. The descending part below, is weaker and runs parallel to the femoral shaft.

It is intimately connected with the joint capsule, and serves to strengthen the joint by resisting hyperextension. Its upper band is sometimes named the iliotrochanteric ligament. Between the two bands is a thinner part of the capsule. In some cases there is no division, and the ligament spreads out into a flat triangular band which is attached to the whole length of the intertrochanteric line.

== Function ==
In a standing posture, when the pelvis is tilted posteriorly, the ligament is twisted and tense, which prevents the trunk from falling backwards and the posture is maintained without the need for muscular activity. In this position the ligament also keeps the femoral head pressed into the acetabulum.

As the hip flexes, the tension in the ligament is reduced and the amount of possible rotations in the hip joint is increased, which permits the pelvis to tilt backwards into its sitting angle. Lateral rotation and adduction in the hip joint is controlled by the strong transversal part, while the descending part limits medial rotation.

Turnout used in the classical ballet style requires a great deal of flexibility in this ligament. As does the front split where the rear leg is hyper-extended at the hip. Many externally rotate the rear leg while doing a front split, this external rotation when the hip is not flexed stretches the ligament even more. This "martial arts split" is distinguished by the rear knee pointing outward sideways (usually the foot along with it) rather than pointing straight down with the patella facing the floor, in a pure extension front split.

== Additional images ==
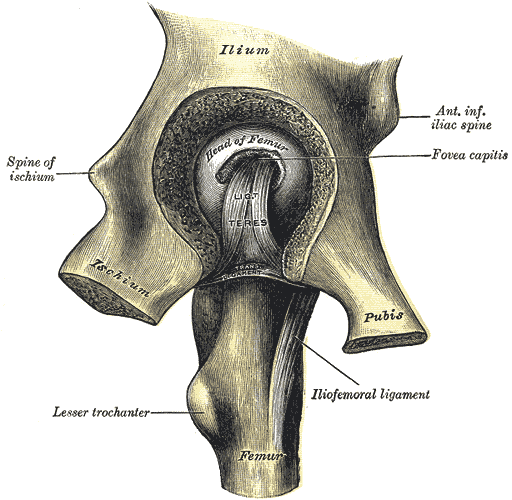
Left hip-joint, opened by removing the floor of the acetabulum from within the pelvis.

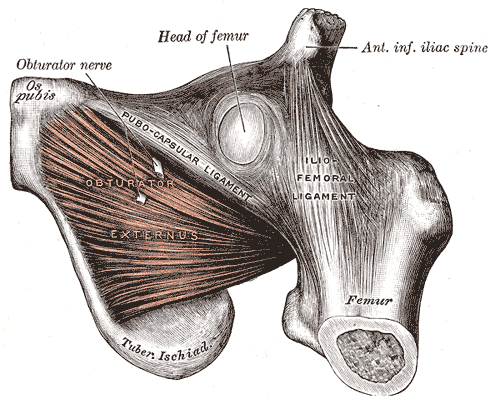
The obturator externus.

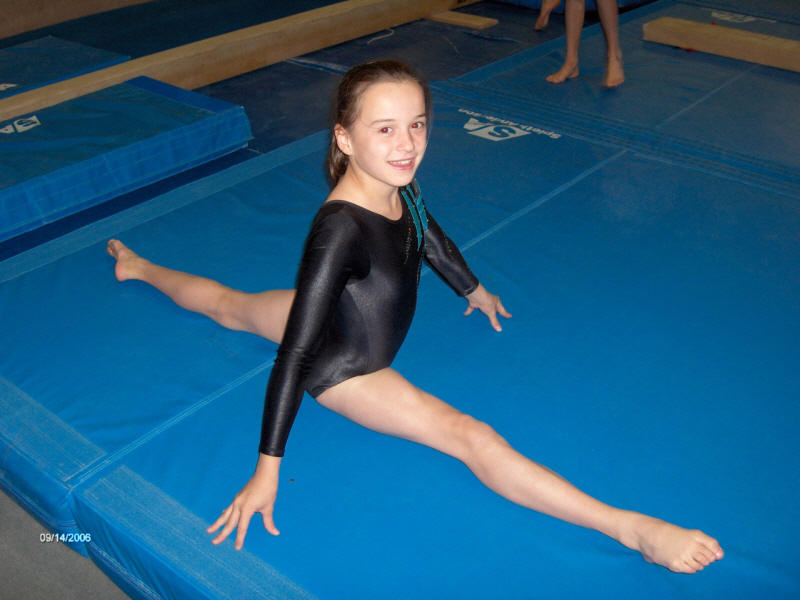
A front split requires mobility in the ligament to adequately extend the rear hip joint.

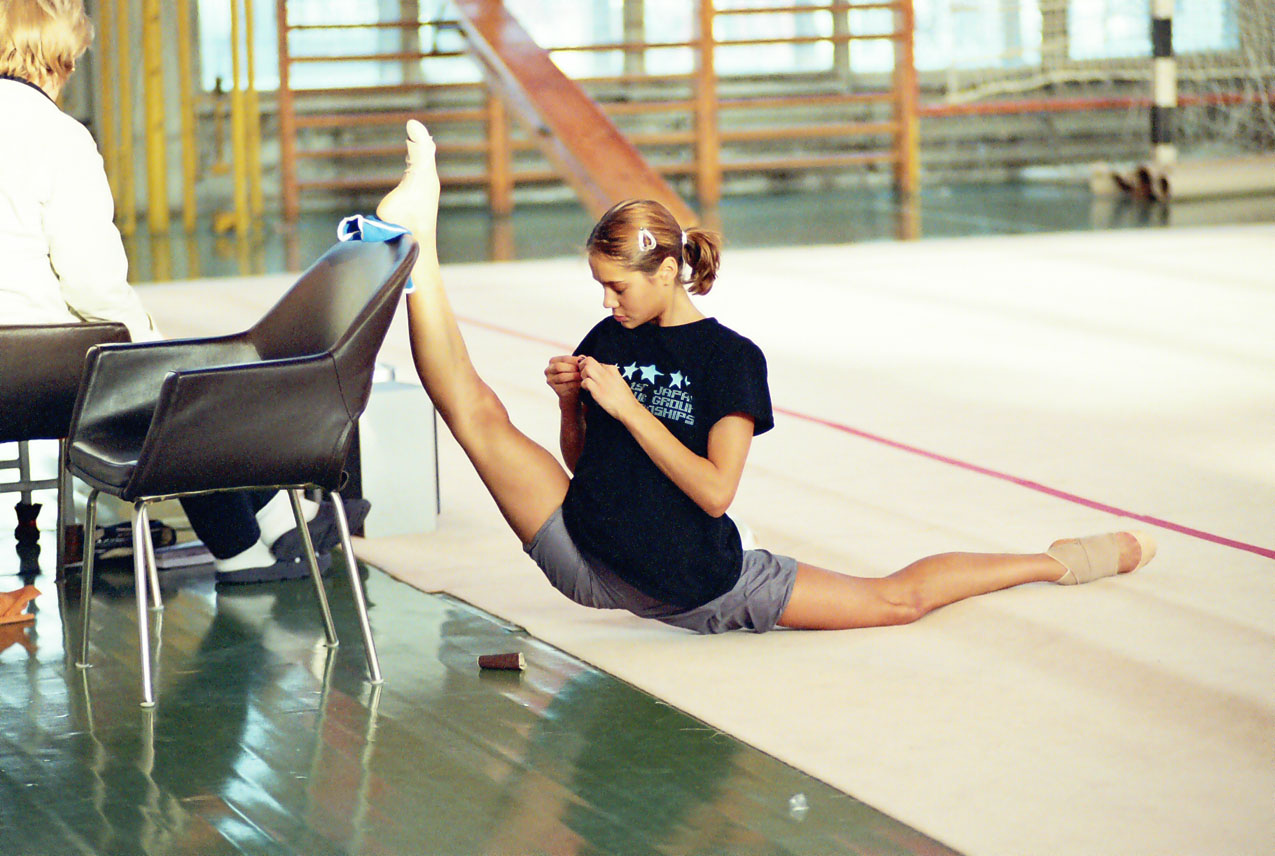
Front oversplits require even more mobility to attain proper hip hyperextension.
