= Ischiofemoral ligament =

Ligament of the hip

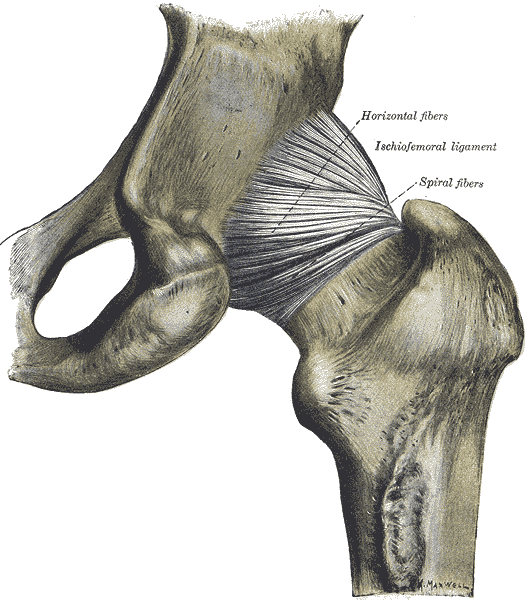
- The hip joint from behind

Details
- From: ischium
- To: femur

Identifiers
- Latin: ligamentum ischiofemorale
- TA98: A03.6.07.006
- TA2: 1878
- FMA: 43027

The ischiofemoral ligament (ischiocapsular ligament or ischiocapsular band) consists of a triangular band of strong fibers on the posterior side of the hip joint. It is one of the four ligaments that reinforce the hip joint. It attaches to the posterior surface of the acetabular rim and acetabular labrum, and extends around the circumference of the joint to insert on the anterior aspect of the femur. The ischiofemoral ligament limits the internal rotation and adduction of the hip when it is in a flexed position.

Some deeper fibres of the ligament are continuous with the fibres of the zona orbicularis of the capsule.

This ligament is less well-defined than the other two capsular ligaments of the hip joint.

== Function ==
Studies of human cadavers found that this ligament limits internal rotation of the hip, regardless of whether the hip is flexed, extended, or in neutral position.
