= Anterior inferior iliac spine =

Hip bone protrusion

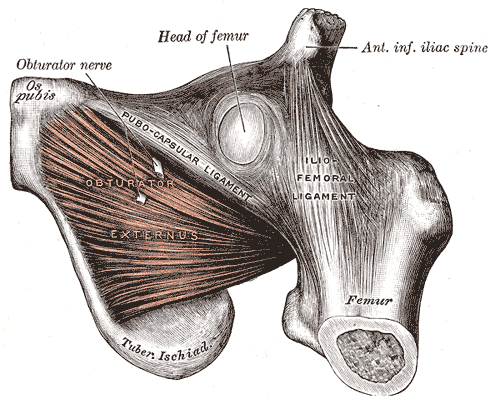
- The obturator externus muscle (anterior inferior iliac spine visible in upper right)

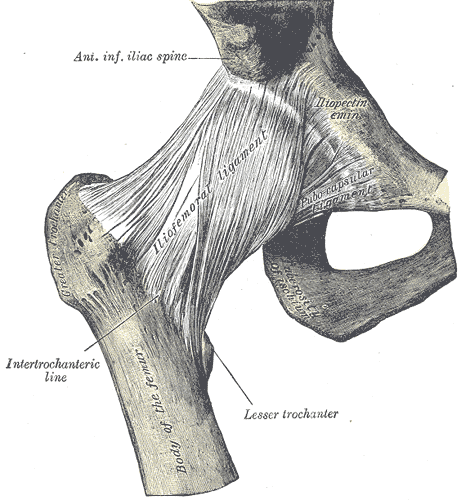
- Right hip-joint from the front (anterior inferior iliac spine visible at upper left)

Details

Identifiers
- Latin: spina iliaca anterior inferior
- TA98: A02.5.01.112
- TA2: 1328
- FMA: 63614

The anterior inferior iliac spine (AIIS) is a bony eminence on the anterior border of the hip bone, or, more precisely, the wing of the ilium.

== Structure ==
The AIIS is a bony eminence on the anterior border of the ilium. It is below the anterior superior iliac spine.

=== Development ===
The AIIS is formed from a separate ossification centre to the rest of the ilium.

== Function ==
The upper portion of the spine gives origin to the straight head of the rectus femoris muscle. A teardrop-shaped lower portion gives origin to the iliofemoral ligament of the hip joint and borders the rim of the acetabulum.

Anteromedially and inferiorly to the AIIS is the iliopsoas groove, the passage for the iliopsoas muscle as it passes down to the lesser trochanter of the femur. A vague line, the inferior gluteal line, might run from the AIIS to the greater sciatic notch which delineates the inferior extent of the origin of gluteus minimus muscle.

== Clinical significance ==
Rectus femoris muscle may avulse from the AIIS with significant mechanical stress. This may be surgically reattached.

== Additional images ==
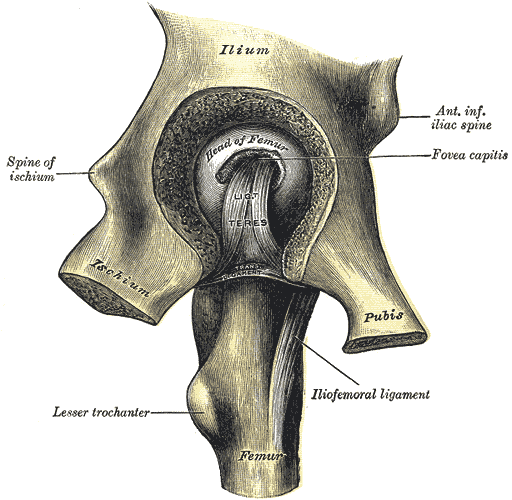
Left hip-joint, opened by removing the floor of the acetabulum from within the pelvis

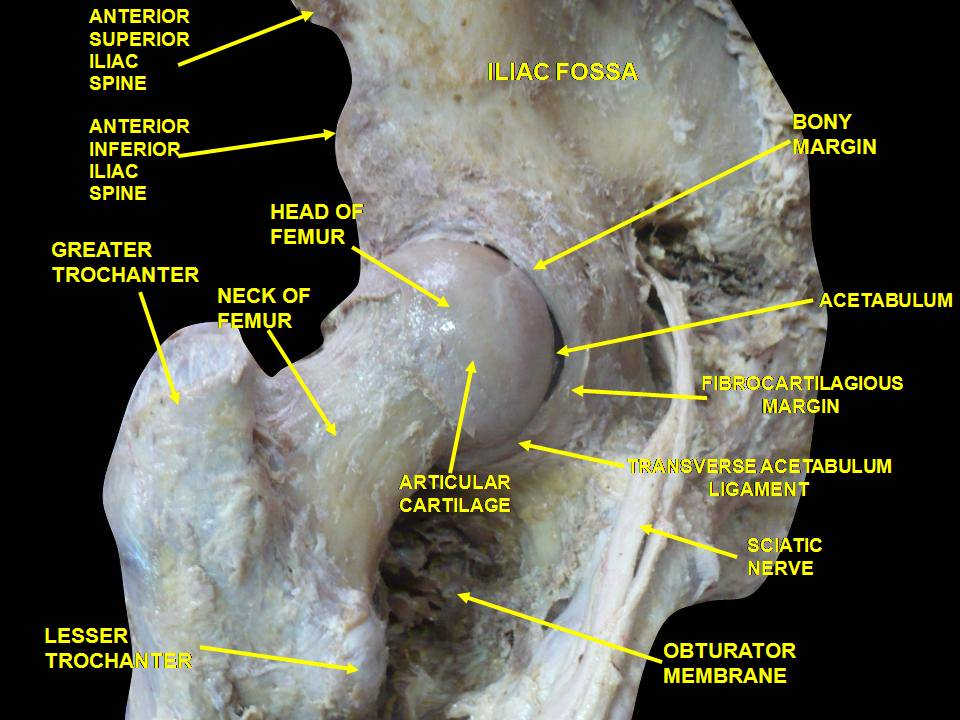
Hip joint. Lateral view. Anterior inferior iliac spine visible to the left.
