= Acetabular labrum =

Ring of cartilage that surrounds the acetabulum of the hip

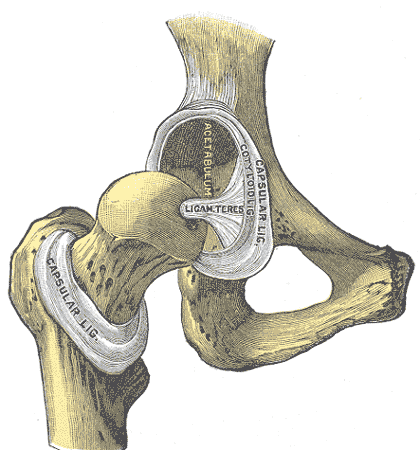
- Hip-joint, front view. The capsular ligament has been largely removed. (Cotyloid lig. visible at center.)

Details

Identifiers
- Latin: labrum acetabuli
- TA98: A03.6.07.008
- TA2: 1880
- FMA: 43521

The acetabular labrum (glenoidal labrum of the hip joint or cotyloid ligament in older texts) is a fibrocartilaginous ring which surrounds the circumference of the acetabulum of the hip, deepening the acetabulum. The labrum is attached onto the bony rim and transverse acetabular ligament. It is triangular in cross-section (with the apex represented by the free margin).

The labrum contributes to the articular surface of the joint (increasing it by almost 10%). It embraces the femoral head, holding it firmly in the joint socket to stabilise the joint. It thus also seals the joint cavity, facilitating even distribution of synovial fluid so that friction is reduced and dissolved nutrients are better distributed.

The labrum is about 2 to 3 mm thick but is wider and thinner in the anterior portion. The anterior portion of the labrum is most susceptible to an acetabular labrum tear.

== See also ==
- Glenoid labrum
