= Intraarticular fracture =

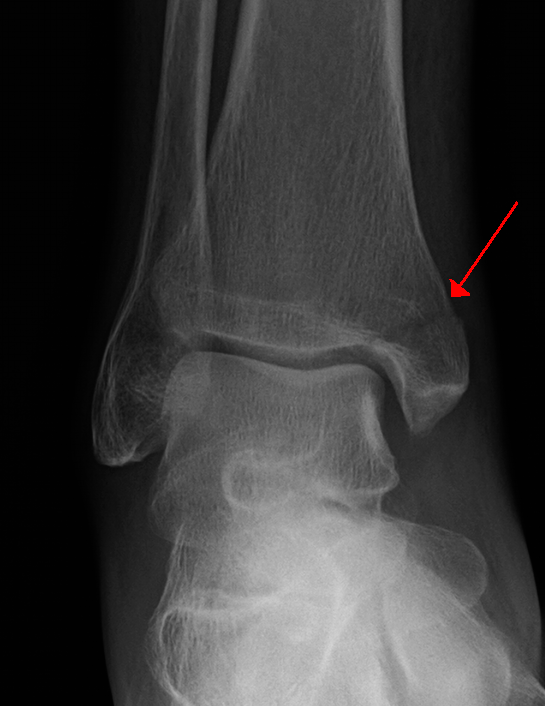
- Example of an intraarticular fracture of the medial malleolus extending in the talocrural ankle joint
- Specialty: Orthopedics

An intraarticular fracture is a bone fracture that typically runs parallel to the joint surface in which the break crosses into the surface of a joint, through the articular cartilage. This always results in damage to the cartilage, an area of limited healing capability. Compared to extraarticular fractures, intraarticular have a higher risk for developing long-term complications, such as posttraumatic osteoarthritis. For the majority of these fractures, anatomic reduction is vital to maintain the integrity of the joint surface.

== Pathophysiology ==
Articular cartilage is composed of 60-80% water and components of collagens. Its functions are to maintain structure with a lifetime of stress and repetition of movement. Biological repair and cellular turnover is therefore limited leading to the restricted response to traumatic injury. Destruction of the cartilage leads to an activation of an inflammatory cascade leading to regeneration or destruction of the cartilage, the basis of posttraumatic osteoarthritis.

These fracture patterns are likely a result of shearing, rotatory, or tangential forces applied to the joint producing segments of both bone and cartilage. The fracture generally run parallel to the joint surface and may be displaced or non displaced. Fragments of this fracture undergo two pathways of healing depending on size and degree of displacement: resorption or loose body formation. If there is vascular communication of the fracture fragment, there is a chance the body will continue to supply that fragment and it will be remained attached to the bone. If there is a disruption of vasculature in the fragment, secondary ossification will occur and the fragment will become a loose body in the joint. With both pathways, there is a continued risk of posttraumatic arthritis and changes to load distribution to the joint.

== Signs and symptoms ==
Generally, fractures are a result of traumatic injury, underlying pathology, or overuse. Fractures are painful though there are no pain receptors in the bone. This is a result of damage to the periosteum and endosteum, hematoma formation, soft tissue injury, and contraction of nearby muscle groups in response to disturbed anatomy. Physical signs include obvious deformity, inability to bear weight or use the limb, bruising, and swelling.

=== Complications ===
Fractures generally heal to full functional capacity via primary or secondary bone healing. Common complications of intrarticular fracture include:

- posttraumatic osteoarthritis
  - As mentioned, damage to the chondral surface of the joint has a high risk of posttraumatic arthritis if the joint is not returned to native alignment.
- malunion
  - When bones are not set back into close to native alignment there is a risk of healing in a malformed position.
- nonunion
  - If there is not adequate blood flow to provide healing factors to the fracture or there is too much movement at the area of injury there is risk of not healing.
  - Diabetes, smoking, and peripheral vascular disease increase risk of nonunion.
- avascular necrosis
  - When fractured, blood supply can be disrupted to certain bones or areas of bone causing that portion of bone to die and necrose.
  - Examples include the femoral head of the hip joint and the scaphoid of the wrist.
- joint stiffness and pain
  - Damaged soft tissue leads to build up of scar tissue which can make joints stiff and painful.

== Diagnosis ==
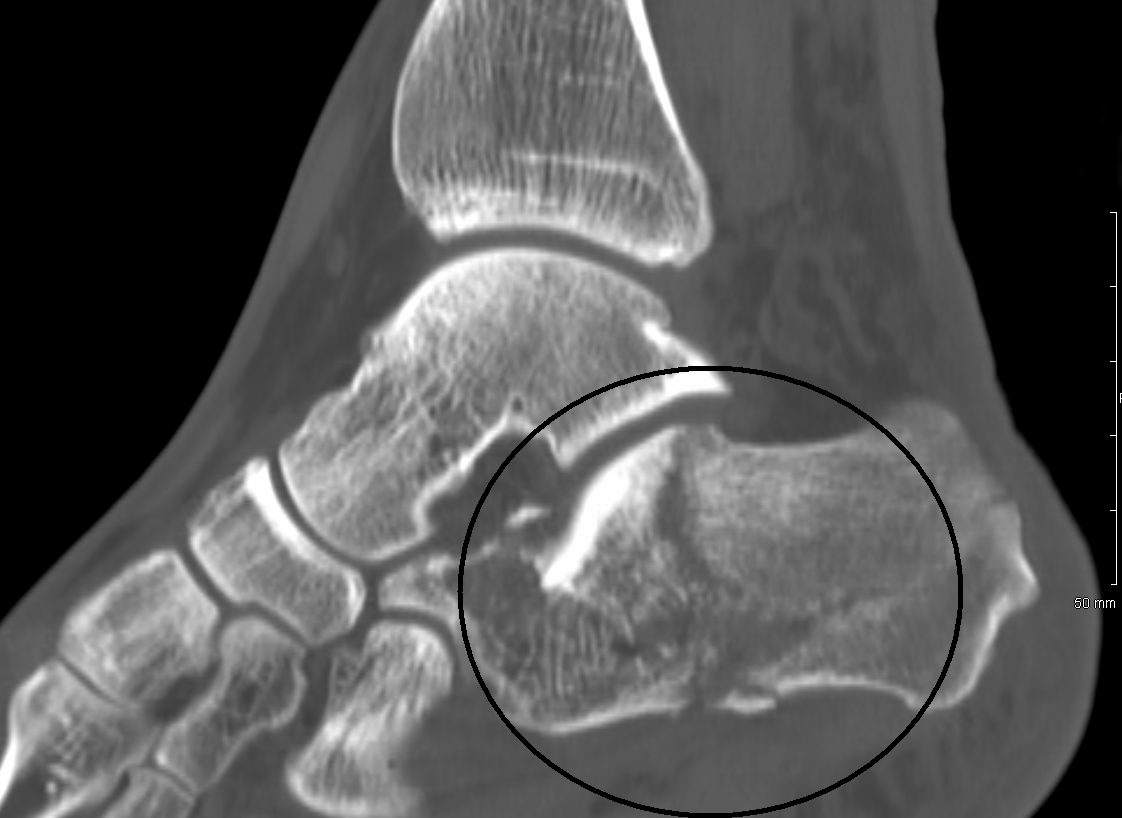
Example of an intraarticular fracture of the calcaneus as seen in the sagittal plane on a Computed Tomography (CT) image.

As with most medical evaluation and diagnosis, history and physical examination are vital to making an accurate diagnosis. Radiographic evaluation is the gold standard to diagnosing a fracture and creating a treatment plan. If there is concern for fracture extension into the joint that is not adequately visualized on radiographs, a Computed Tomography (CT) or Magnetic Resonance Imaging (MRI) should be considered. MRI is especially useful to classify or grade degree of condral damage. Advanced imaging, CT or MRI is a common modality for surgical planning.

=== Examples of intraarticular fractures ===
- Bennett's Fracture
  - intraarticular fracture of the base of the first metacarpal
- Rolando Fracture
  - comminuted intraarticular fracture of the base of the first metacarpal
- Calcaneal Fracture
  - fracture of the calcaneus that may extend into the subtalar joint
- Tibial Plateau Fracture
  - fracture of the proximal portion of the tibia that may extend into the knee joint
- Pilon Fracture
  - fracture of the distal articular surface of the tibia
- Distal Radius Fracture
  - fracture of the distal portion of the radius that may extend into the wrist joint
- Olecranon Fracture
  - fracture of the olecranon process of the ulna at the elbow
- Femoral Head Fracture
  - fracture of the head of the femur that may extend into the hip joint

Some of these fractures such as a Bennett's or Rolando fracture are coined based on their intraarticular involvement, while others such as femoral head fractures, tibial plateau fractures, and distal radius fractures may or may not extend into the joint.

== Treatment ==
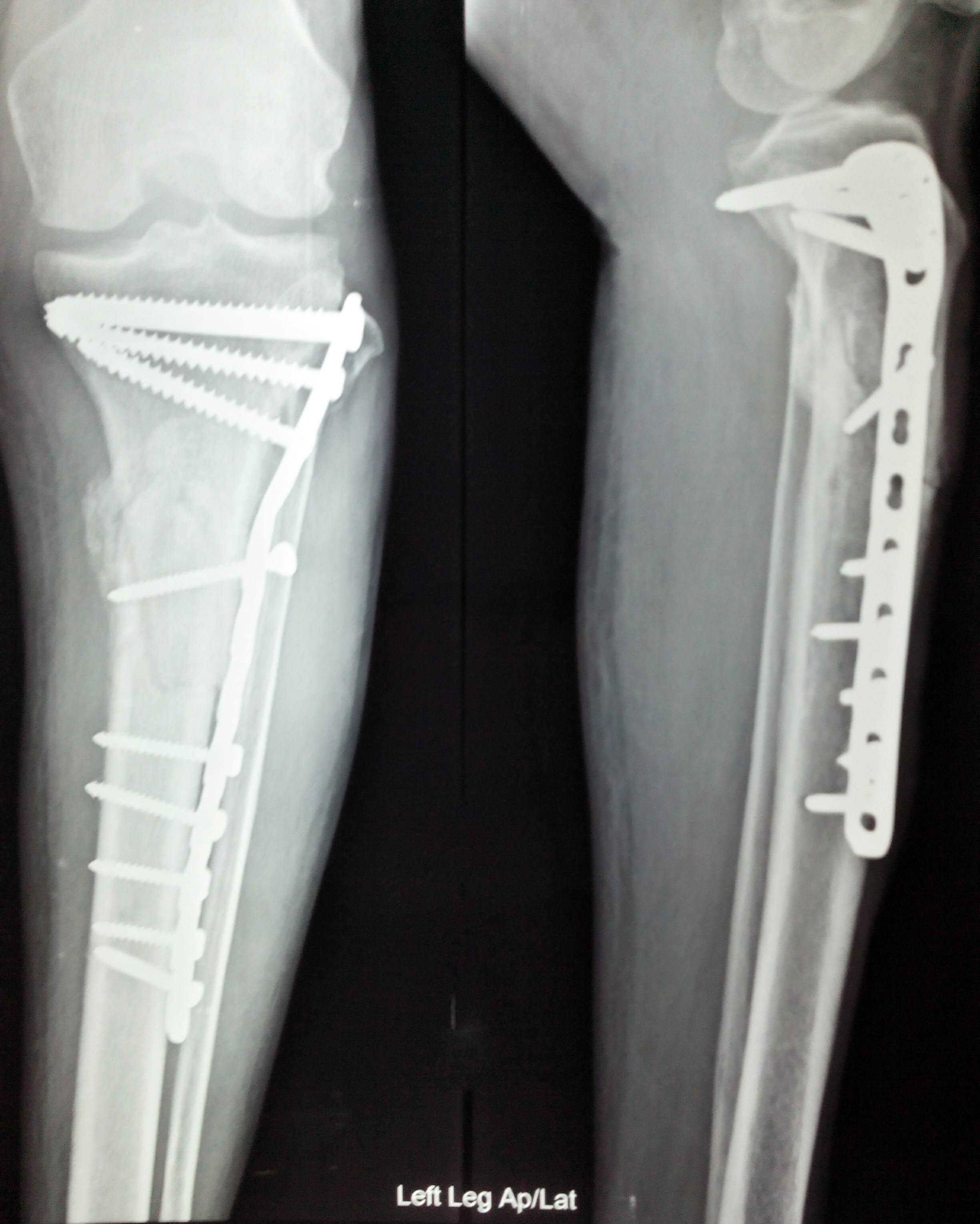
An AP and lateral radiograph of the tibia and fibula post open reduction internal fixation of a tibial plateau fracture An AP radiograph of the pelvis demonstrating a cemented right hemiarthroplasty

Treatment of intraarticular fracture usually falls into conservative (nonsurgical) or surgical management depending on the degree of displacement or movement of the fractured piece from native alignment. Treatment often relies on fracture reduction with use of sedation or local anesthetic to attempt to reset the alignment into tolerances that favor bone healing. This is often done in an emergency room setting or clinic and the patient may be placed into an immobilization device such as a splint or cast to allow time for healing.

Surgical intervention is most common in cases of intraarticular fractures because it allows direct visualization of the joint surface to help mediate chances of posttraumatic osteoarthritis. Risks of surgical intervention include blood loss, infection, and problems with wound healing. Most commonly, open reduction internal fixation (ORIF) is the modality used which utilizes plates and screws to restore alignment of the fracture. Recently, there has been a push for minimally invasive options, such as percutaneous pinning, secondary to wound complications with use of ORIF. With pinning, intraoperative radiography is used to drive screws through the skin. However, with this technique, there continues to be some risk of posttraumatic arthritis due to the joint surface not being viewed during operation. Even with perfect joint alignment there continues to be a risk of posttraumatic arthritis. Another benefit with surgical intervention is visualization and evacuation of any condral fragments or loose bodies that may increase arthritis risk, lead to decreased range of motion of the joint as well as pain. In some instances, primarily seen with femoral head fractures on the weight bearing surface of the bone, joint replacement is indicated. The femoral head is known for leading to avascular necrosis and ORIF is not sufficient to maintain the blood supply to the fractured fragment. Therefore, replacement of the femoral head with a hemiarthroplasty or total hip arthroplasty is indicated in this case.

== Postoperative management ==
After surgical management the area must be maintained clean and dry to avoid infection at the skin. Splints, casts, or braces are used to immobilize the fractured area to decrease the risk of nonunion. The immobilization period must be short to decrease the risk of stiffness and muscles atrophy due to nonuse of the area. Physical Therapist play a role in guided return to activity, wound care, and strengthening as the patient weans out of their immobilization device.

Fracture healing depends on the type of fracture, type of management, and patients biology and comorbidities. Based on this, patients may need to be immobilized for longer periods of time to allow for adequate healing. Postoperative radiographs in the clinical setting are used to evaluate callus formation, new bone. These radiographs are used in conjunction with patients symptoms to guide progression to full activity.

== See also ==
- Intracapsular fracture
