= Dynamic hip screw =

Orthopedic implant

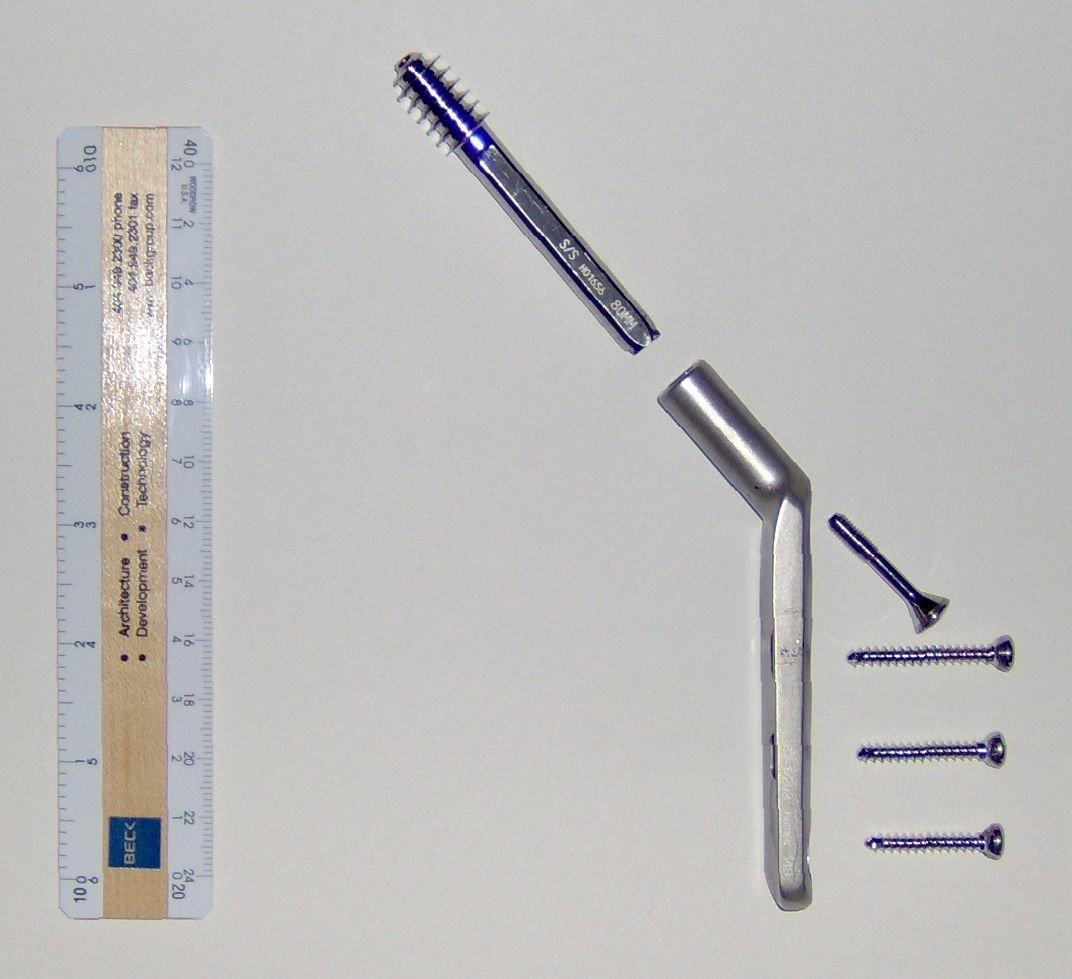
Dynamic hip screw

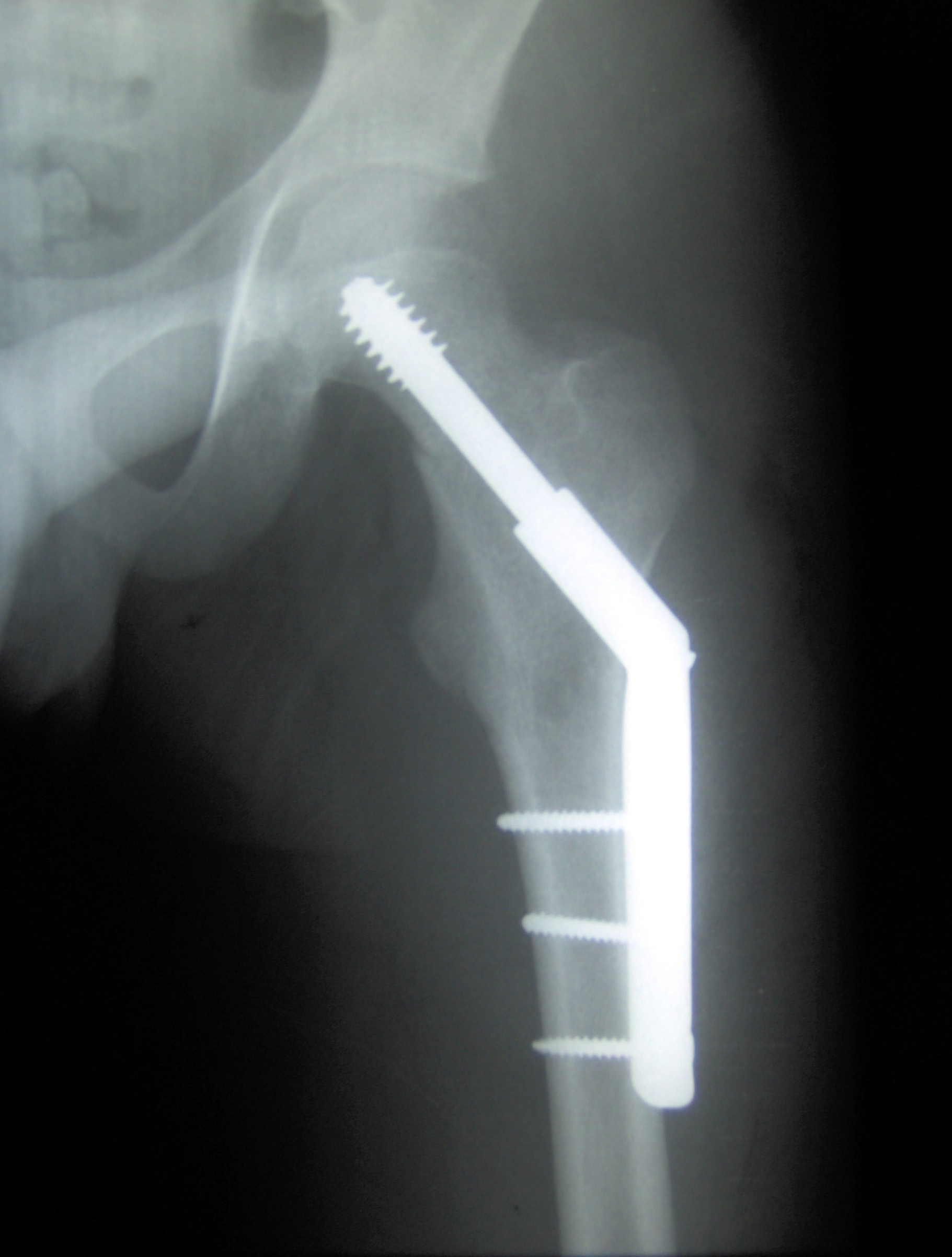
Fracture supported by dynamic hip screw

A dynamic hip screw (DHS) or sliding screw fixation is a type of orthopaedic implant designed for fixation of certain types of hip fractures which allows controlled dynamic sliding of the femoral head component along the construct. It is the most commonly used implant for extracapsular fractures of the hip, which are common in older osteoporotic patients. There are 3 components of a dynamic hip screw, including a lag screw (inserted into the neck of the femur), a sideplate and several cortical screws (fixated into the proximal femoral shaft). The idea behind the dynamic compression is that the femoral head component is allowed to move along one plane; since bone responds to dynamic stresses, the native femur may undergo primary healing: cells join along boundaries, resulting in a robust joint requiring no remodeling.
