= Garden classification =

Hip fracture classification system

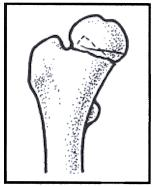
Garden Type 1 Fractured Neck of Femur

The Garden classification is a system of categorizing intracapsular hip fractures of the femoral neck. This fracture often disrupt the blood supply to the femoral head.

British orthopaedic surgeon Robert Symon Garden described a classification system for this type of fracture, referred to as the Garden classification and consisting of four grades:

== Classification ==
There are four distinct types:

Types	Description
1	Incomplete Stable fracture with impaction in valgus. (Note: In orthopaedics, valgus refers to the state of a bone or joint that deviates outward relative to the rest of the body, involving displacement.)
2	Complete but non displaced with two group of trabeculae in line.
3	Partially displaced with varus with all three trabeculae disturb. (Note: In orthopaedics, a varus is the opposite condition to a valgus.)
4	Completely displaced with no contact between the fracture fragments.

== Clinical relevance ==
The blood supply of the femoral head is much more likely to be disrupted in Garden types 3 or 4 fractures. Surgeons may treat these types of fracture by replacing the fractured bone with a prosthesis arthroplasty. Alternatively the treatment is to reduce the fracture (manipulate the fragments back into a good position) and fix them in place with metal screws. Common practice is to repair Garden 1 and 2 fractures with screws, and to replace Garden 3 and 4 fractures with arthroplasty, except in young patients in whom screw repair is attempted first, followed by arthroplasty if necessary. This is done in an effort to conserve the natural joint since prosthetic joints ultimately wear out and have to be replaced. A serious but common complication of a fractured femoral neck is avascular necrosis. The vasculature to the femoral head is easily disturbed during fractures or from swelling inside the joint capsule. This can lead to strangulation of the blood supply to the femoral head and death of the bone and cartilage.

== Robert Symon Garden ==
Robert Symon Garden (2 August 1910 – 16 October 1982) was a Scottish orthopaedic surgeon best known for establishing the Garden classification. He was also the father of the Scottish comedian, actor, author, artist and television presenter Graeme Garden. Garden held the professional qualification of FCRS (Fellowship of the Royal Colleges of Surgeons). He was also a member of:

- British Orthopaedic Association
- Société Internationale de Chirurgie Orthopédique et de Traumatologie
- Liverpool Medical Institution (honorary member)

He married Janet Ann McHardy in 1939. The couple had two children: Graeme and Elizabeth.
