= Ruth Wynne-Davies =

- Born: Ruth Blower; 1926; London, England
- Died: 2012 (aged 85–86); Oxford, England

Ruth Wynne-Davies or Ruth Blower (1926–2012) was a British medical doctor and scholar of orthopaedics. She researched and wrote about clubfoot and scoliosis.

== Life and career ==
Wynne-Davies was born in London in 1926. She attended Oswestry High School for Girls. After finishing school, she was a land girl. She then worked as a secretary before starting her training in medicine at the Royal Free School of Medicine. She was encouraged and financially supported to do so by her uncle, Llewellyn Wynne-Davies. In 1959, she changed her name to Wynne-Davies, in his honour.

In her early medical career, she worked at Great Ormond Street Hospital as a house officer, then as a surgical registrar at the Elizabeth Garrett Anderson Hospital. After a period of time as a prosector in anatomy at the Royal Free Hospital in London, she became a fellow of the Royal College of Surgeons in 1960.

She turned her attention to research at University of Edinburgh, completing work on the genetics of clubfoot, and publishing numerous research articles on that subject. She received a medal from the British Orthopaedic Association. She made significant contributions to research in the field of scoliosis. She also set up specialist clinics for treating scoliosis in Harlow Wood, Edinburgh, London and Oswestry.

Wynne-Davies achieved a PhD in 1973 for her thesis on the aetiology of scoliosis, before becoming a reader in orthopaedics. She took early retirement from the University of Edinburgh in 1981, moving to Oxford. There, she studied English Language and Literature at the University of Oxford Department of Continuing Education.

She died in Oxford in 2012.

In 2018, Wynne-Davies was found to be the most highly-cited British author of works on spinal deformity.

== Publications ==
- James, John Ivor Pulsford, Zorab, P.A., & Wynne-Jones, Ruth (1967) Scoliosis. E & S Livingstone
- Wynne-Davis, Ruth (1973) Genetic and Other Factors in the Aetiology of Scoliosis. University of Edinburgh
- Wynne-Davies, Ruth, Hall, Christine M. & Apley, Alan Graham (1985) Atlas of Skeletal Dysplasias. Churchill Livingstone
