= Healthcare Quality Improvement Partnership =

The Healthcare Quality Improvement Partnership (HQIP) was established in April 2008 to promote improvement in health services, by increasing the impact that clinical audit has on healthcare quality in England and Wales and, in some cases other devolved nations. It is led by a consortium of the Academy of Medical Royal Colleges and the Royal College of Nursing.

== Overview ==
The Partnership holds the contract to commission, manage, and develop the National Clinical Audit and Patient Outcomes Programme (NCAPOP). This consists of more than 40 clinical audits, registries and confidential enquiries that cover a range of health conditions. Their purpose is to engage clinicians in systematic evaluation of their clinical practice against standards (often set by NICE), and to encourage improvement in the quality of care. This programme is gradually being extended to other areas of healthcare, working with clinical, patient and professional advisory groups.

HQIP also hosts the National Joint Registry which was set up to collect information in England and Wales on joint replacement operations and to monitor the performances of implants, hospitals and surgeons. Additionally, the Partnership works closely with a number of national and professional leadership bodies and organisations including the Care Quality Commission (CQC), NHS England and Health Data Research UK, among others.

== National Clinical Audits ==
- Adult Diabetes
- Breast Cancer in Older Patients
- Cardiovascular Disease Prevention Audit, CVDPREVENT
- Care at the End of Life
- Chronic Obstructive Pulmonary Disease / Asthma: Respiratory care
- Dementia
- Emergency Laparotomy
- Falls and Fragility Fracture including the National hip fracture database
- Lung Cancer
- Maternal and Perinatal
- National Gastro-intestinal Cancer Audit: Bowel Cancer Audit
- National Gastro-intestinal Cancer Audit: Oesophago-Gastric Cancer Audit
- National Joint Registry (UK)
- National Vascular Registry
- National Neonatal Audit Programme
- Paediatric Diabetes
- Paediatric Intensive Care Audit
- Prostate Cancer Audit
- Psychosis Audit
- Early Inflammatory Arthritis Audit
- Seizures and Epilepsy in Children and Young People
- Sentinel Stroke Audit Programme

== Clinical Outcome Review Programmes ==
- Mental Health
- Child Health
- Medical and Surgical
- Maternal and Newborn Infant

== Mortality Review Programme ==
- National Child Mortality Database

== Non-NCAPOP Commissions ==
- Perinatal Mortality Review Tool

== Former programmes ==
A list of all former HQIP programmes is available on the HQIP website.
