= Hip fracture =

Broken bone in hip joint region

- Other names: Proximal femur fracture; femoral neck fracture [main hyponym]; femoral head fracture [other hyponym]
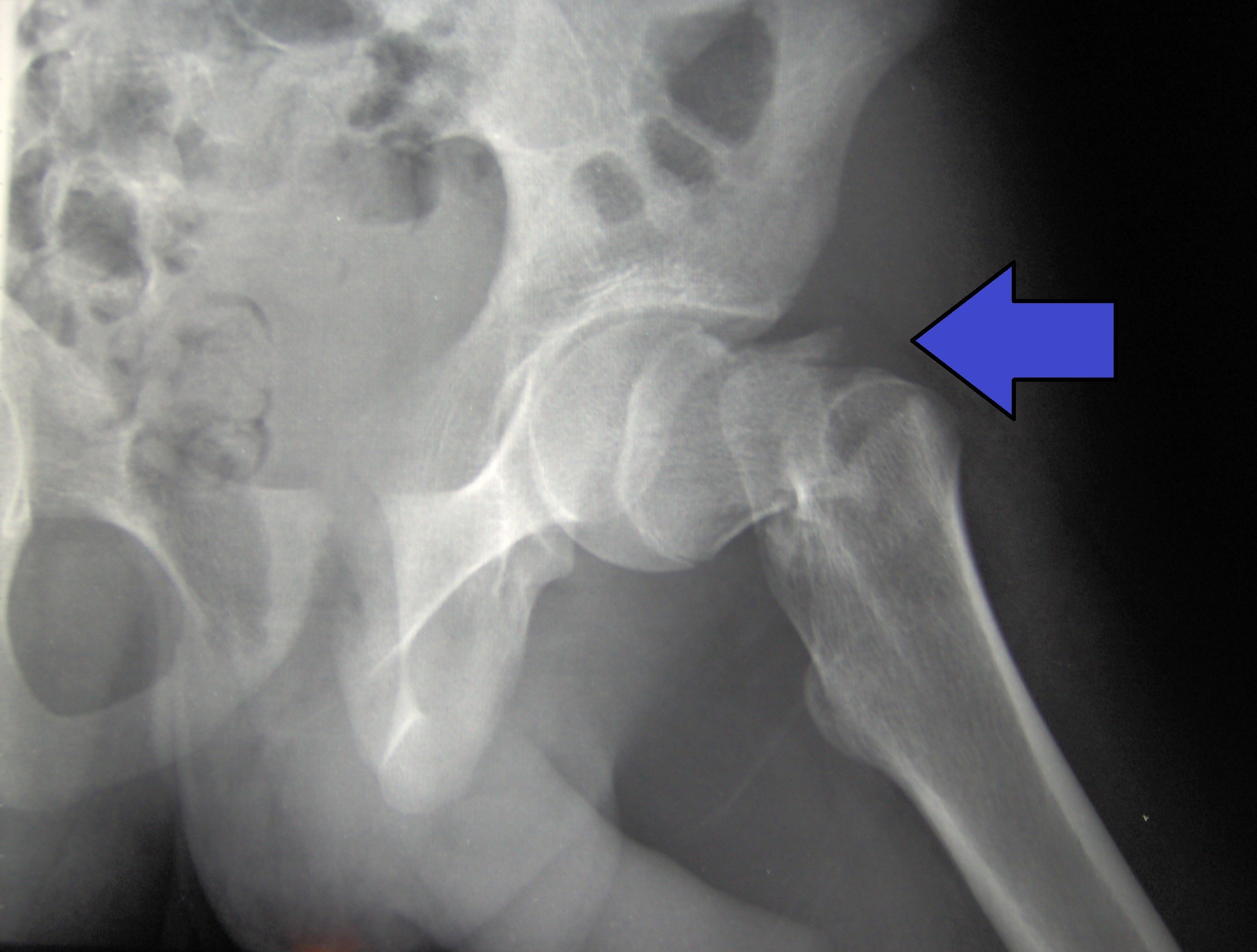
- Intertrochanteric hip fracture in a 17-year-old male
- Specialty: Orthopedic surgery, emergency medicine
- Symptoms: Pain around the hip particularly with movement, shortening of the leg
- Types: Intracapsular, extracapsular (intertrochanteric, subtrochanteric, greater trochanteric, lesser trochanteric)
- Causes: Trauma such as a fall
- Risk factors: Osteoporosis, taking many medications, alcohol use, metastatic cancer
- Diagnostic method: X-ray, MRI, CT scan, bone scan
- Differential diagnosis: Osteoarthritis, avascular necrosis of the hip, hernia, trochanteric bursitis
- Prevention: Improved lighting, removal of loose rugs, exercise, treatment of osteoporosis
- Treatment: Surgery
- Medication: Opioids, nerve block
- Prognosis: ~20% one year risk of death (older people)
- Frequency: ~15% of women at some point

A hip fracture is a break that occurs in the upper part of the femur (thigh bone), at the femoral neck or (rarely) the femoral head. Symptoms may include pain around the hip, particularly with movement, and shortening of the leg. Usually the person cannot walk.

A hip fracture is usually a femoral neck fracture. Such fractures most often occur as a result of a fall. (Femoral head fractures are a rare kind of hip fracture that may also be the result of a fall but are more commonly caused by more violent incidents such as traffic accidents.) Risk factors include osteoporosis, taking many medications, alcohol use, and metastatic cancer. Diagnosis is generally by X-rays. Magnetic resonance imaging, a CT scan, or a bone scan may occasionally be required to make the diagnosis.

Pain management may involve opioids or a nerve block. If the person's health allows, surgery is generally recommended within two days. Options for surgery may include a total hip replacement, hemiarthroplasty (half hip replacement) or stabilizing the fracture with screws. Treatment to prevent blood clots following surgery is recommended.

About 15% of women break their hip at some point in life; women are more often affected than men. Hip fractures become more common with age. The risk of death in the year following a fracture is about 20% in older people.

== Signs and symptoms ==
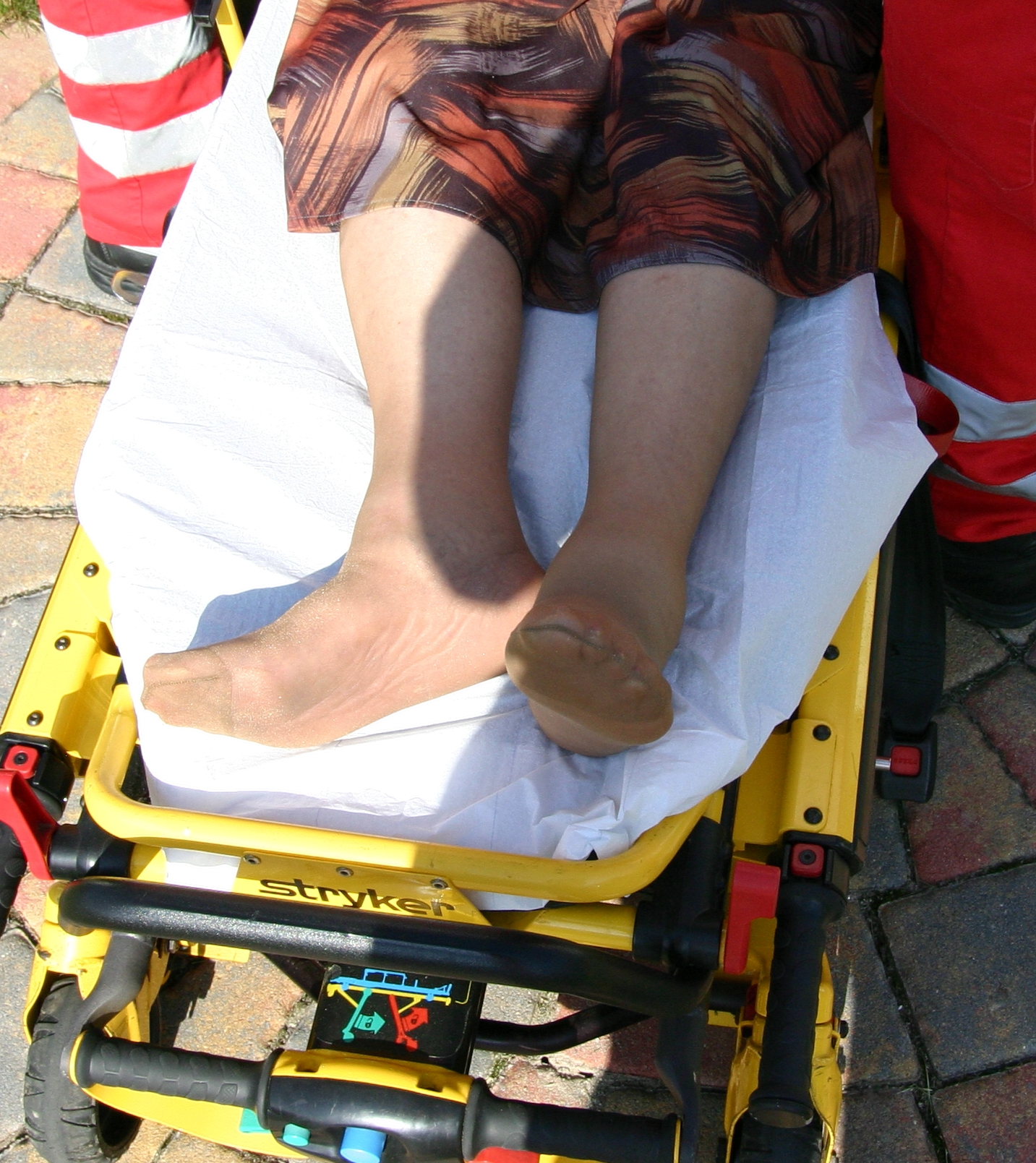
The affected extremity is often shortened and unnaturally, externally rotated compared to the unaffected leg.

The classic clinical presentation of a hip fracture is an elderly patient who sustained a low-energy fall and now has groin pain and is unable to bear weight. Pain may be referred to the supracondylar knee. On examination, the affected extremity is often shortened and externally rotated compared to the unaffected leg.

=== Complications ===
Nonunion, failure of the fracture to heal, is common in fractures of the neck of the femur, but much more rare with other types of hip fracture. Avascular necrosis of the femoral head occurs frequently (20%) in intracapsular hip fractures, because the blood supply is interrupted.

Malunion, healing of the fracture in a distorted position, is very common. The thigh muscles tend to pull on the bone fragments, causing them to overlap and reunite incorrectly. Shortening, varus deformity, valgus deformity, and rotational malunion all occur often because the fracture may be unstable and collapse before it heals. This may not be as much of a concern in patients with limited independence and mobility.

Hip fractures rarely result in neurological or vascular injury.

==== Medical ====
Most people who have a hip fracture are living with frailty. This means they are at increased risk of developing complications after an injury or surgery. Some people also are unwell before breaking a hip. It is common for the break to have been caused by a fall due to some illness, especially in the elderly. Additionally, the stress of the injury, and a likely surgery, increases the risk of medical illness including heart attack, stroke, and chest infection.

Hip fracture patients are at considerable risk for thromboembolism, blood clots that dislodge and travel in the bloodstream. Deep venous thrombosis (DVT) - clots forming in the deep veins of the leg - is very common after hip fracture as the circulation is stagnant and the blood is hypercoagulable as a response to injury. DVT can occur without causing symptoms. A pulmonary embolism (PE) occurs when clotted blood from a DVT comes loose from the leg veins and passes up to the lungs. Circulation to parts of the lungs is cut off which can be very dangerous. Fatal PE may have an incidence of 2% after hip fracture and may contribute to illness and mortality in other cases.

Delirium is extremely common following a hip fracture. It is most common in the first few days after hip fracture. It usually clears completely. There are multiple causes including inflammation as a result of the fracture and surgery, as well as pain, immobility, moving to a strange place, and drugs and medical complications following hip fracture (such as pneumonia and cardiac issues). Delirium after hip fracture is associated with an increased risk of being diagnosed with dementia. There are currently no drug treatments that have been shown to reduce the risk of developing delirium after hip fracture.

Urinary tract infection (UTI) can occur. Patients are immobilized and in bed for many days; they are frequently catheterised, commonly causing infection.

Prolonged immobilization and difficulty moving make it hard to avoid pressure sores on the sacrum and heels of patients with hip fractures. Whenever possible, early mobilization is advocated; otherwise, alternating pressure mattresses should be used.

== Risk factors ==
Hip fracture following a fall is likely to be a pathological fracture. The most common causes of weakness in bone are:

- Osteoporosis.
- Other metabolic bone diseases such as Paget's disease, osteomalacia, osteopetrosis and osteogenesis imperfecta. Stress fractures may occur in the hip region with metabolic bone disease.
- Elevated levels of homocysteine, a toxic 'natural' amino acid.
- Benign or malignant primary bone tumors are rare causes of hip fractures.
- Metastatic cancer deposits in the proximal femur may weaken the bone and cause a pathological hip fracture.
- Infection in the bone is a rare cause of hip fracture.
- Tobacco smoking (associated with osteoporosis).

== Mechanism ==
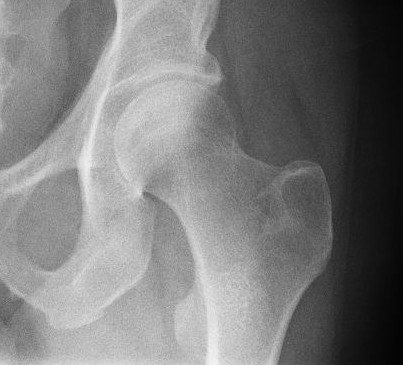
X-ray of a normal hip joint.

=== Functional anatomy ===
The hip joint is a ball-and-socket joint. The femur connects at the acetabulum of the pelvis and projects laterally before angling medially and inferiorly to form the knee. Although this joint has three degrees of freedom, it is still stable due to the interaction of ligaments and cartilage. The labrum lines the circumference of the acetabulum to provide stability and shock absorption. Articular cartilage covers the concave area of acetabulum, providing more stability and shock absorption. Surrounding the entire joint itself is a capsule secured by the tendon of the psoas muscle and three ligaments. The iliofemoral, or Y, ligament is located anteriorly and serves to prevent hip hyperextension. The pubofemoral ligament is located anteriorly just underneath the iliofemoral ligament and serves primarily to resist abduction, extension, and some external rotation. Finally the ischiofemoral ligament on the posterior side of the capsule resists extension, adduction, and internal rotation. When considering the biomechanics of hip fractures, it is important to examine the mechanical loads the hip experiences during low energy falls.

=== Biomechanics ===
The hip joint is unique in that it experiences combined mechanical loads. An axial load along the shaft of the femur results in compressive stress. Bending load at the neck of the femur causes tensile stress along the upper part of the neck and compressive stress along the lower part of the neck. While osteoarthritis and osteoporosis are associated with bone fracture as we age, these diseases are not the cause of the fracture alone. Low energy falls from standing are responsible for the majority of fractures in the elderly, but fall direction is also a key factor. Elderly patients tend to fall to the side instead of forward, and the lateral hip strikes the ground first. During a sideways fall, the chances of hip fracture see a 15-fold and 12-fold increase in elderly males and females, respectively.

=== Neurological factors ===
Elderly individuals are also predisposed to hip fractures due to many factors that can compromise proprioception and balance, including medications, vertigo, stroke, and peripheral neuropathy.

== Diagnosis ==
=== Physical examination ===
Displaced fractures of the trochanter or femoral neck will classically cause external rotation and shortening of the leg when the patient is laying supine.

=== Imaging ===
Typically, radiographs are taken of the hip from the front (AP view), and side (lateral view). Frog leg views are to be avoided, as they may cause severe pain and further displace the fracture. In situations where a hip fracture is suspected but not obvious on x-ray, an MRI is the next test of choice. If an MRI is not available or the patient can not be placed into the scanner a CT may be used as a substitute. MRI sensitivity for radiographically occult fracture is greater than CT. Bone scan is less sensitive, especially immediately after injury and in the elderly.

A case demonstrating a possible order of imaging in initially subtle findings:

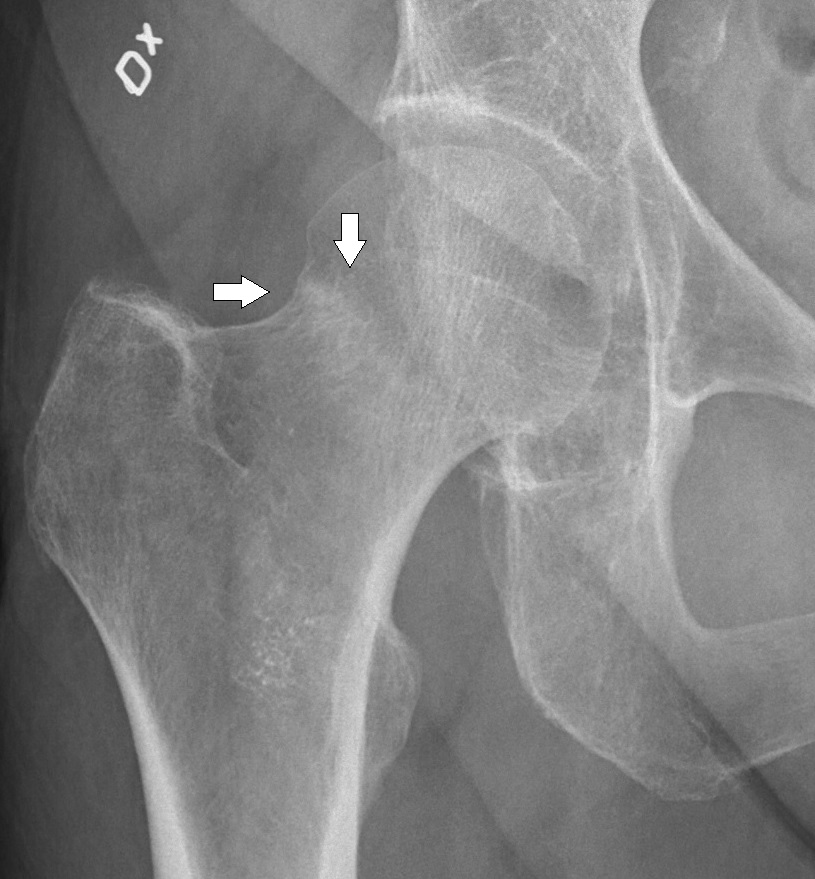
X-ray showing a suspected compressive subcapital fracture as a radiodense line

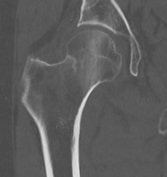
CT scan shows the same, atypical for a fracture since the cortex is coherent

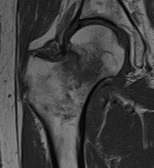
T1-weighted, turbo spin echo, MRI confirms a fracture, as the surrounding bone marrow has low signal from edema.

As the patients most often require an operation, full pre-operative general investigation is required. This would normally include blood tests, ECG and chest x-ray.

=== Types ===
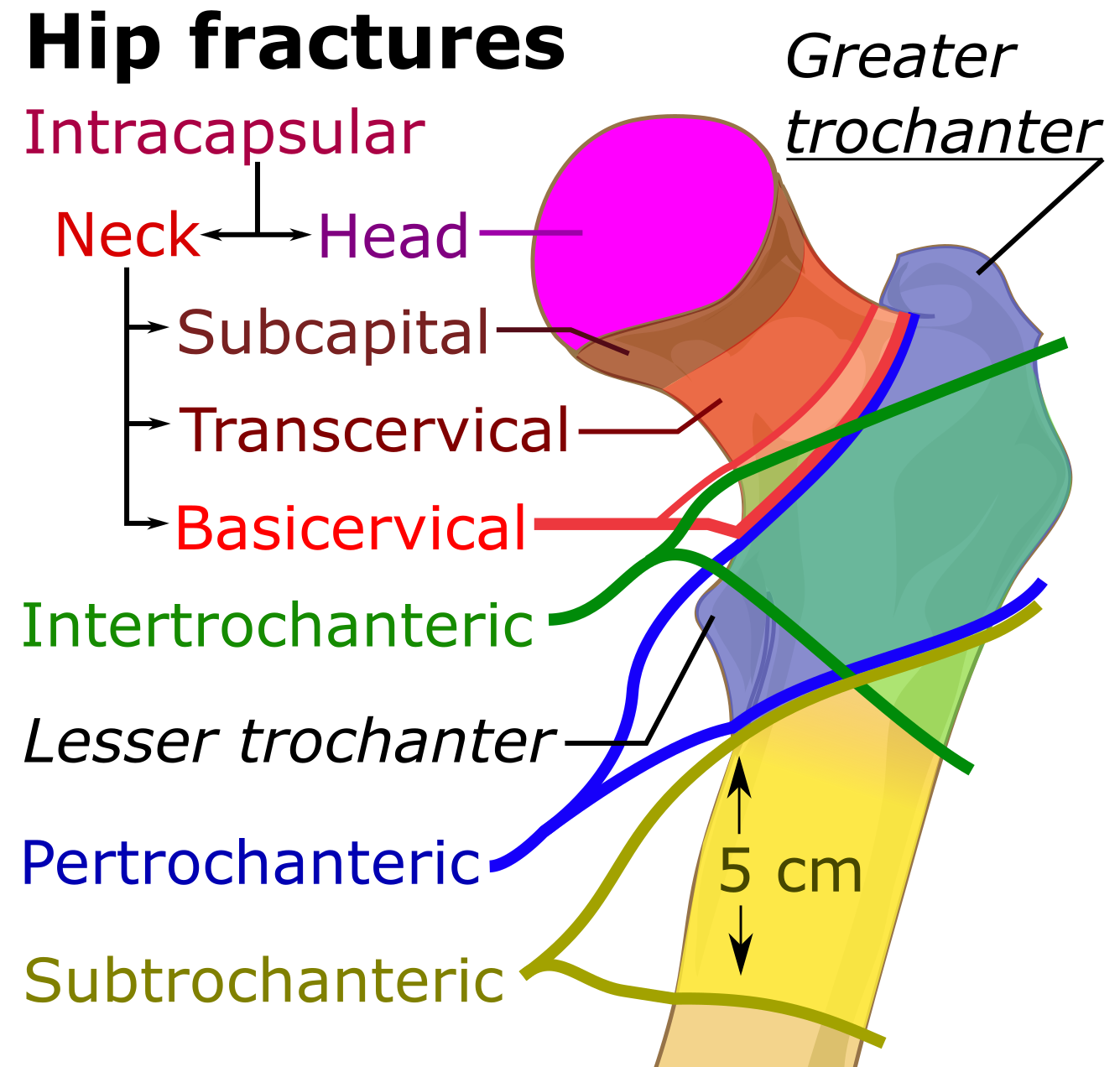
Hip fracture classification.

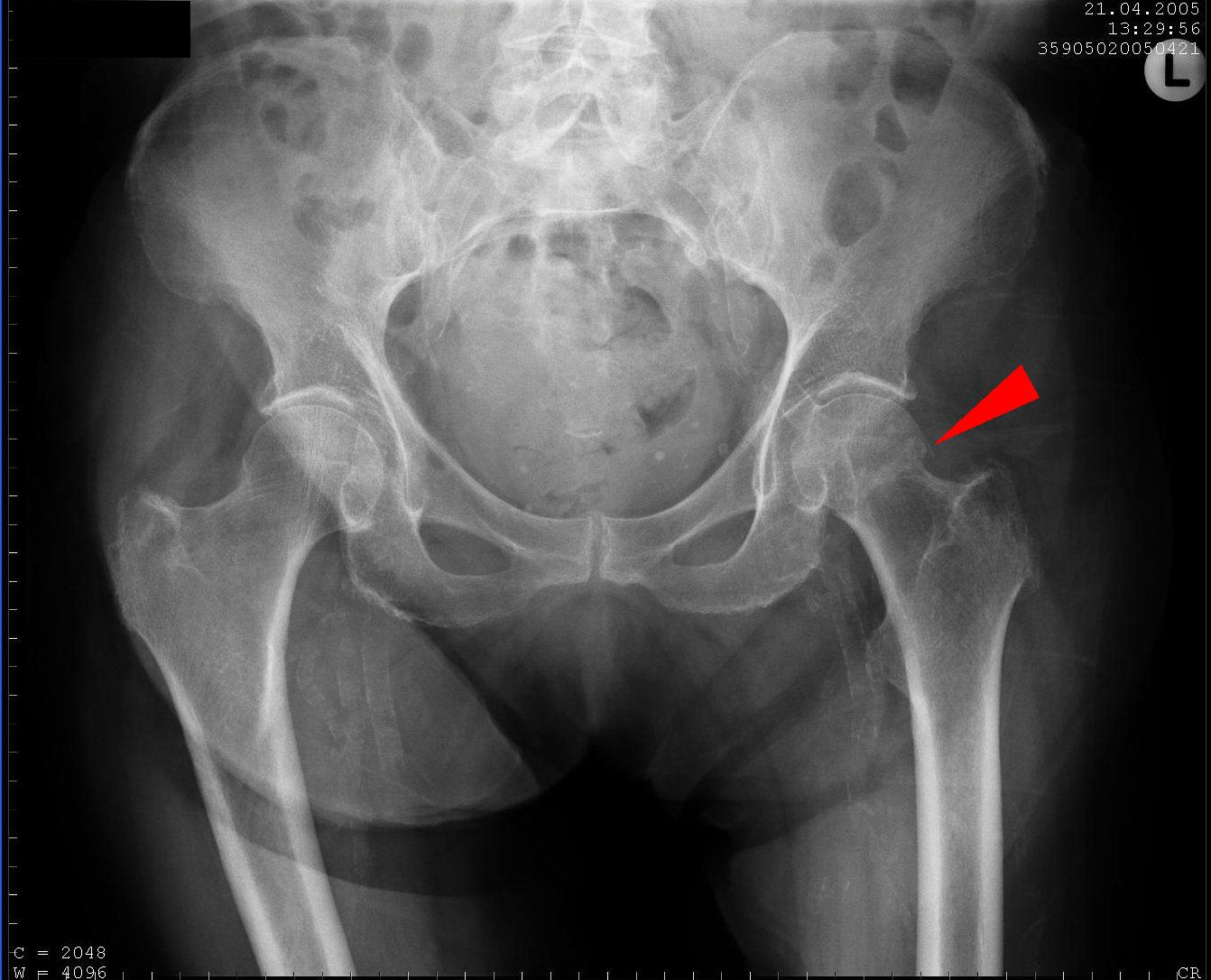
Subcapital fracture in a 92-year-old woman

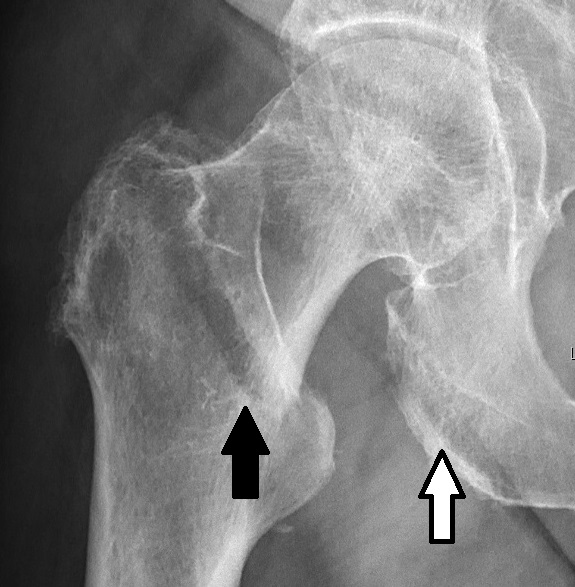
Fracture (black arrow, pertrochanteric) versus a skin fold (white arrow).

X-rays of the affected hip usually make the diagnosis obvious; AP (anteroposterior) and lateral views should be obtained.

| Capsule | Area | | Classification | |
|---|---|---|---|---|
| Intracapsular | femoral head | | AO 31-C1 – 31-C3 | Pipkin classification |
| Intracapsular | femoral neck | Subcapital | AO 31-B1 – 31-B3 | Garden classification, Pauwel's classification |
| Intracapsular | femoral neck | Transcervical | AO 31-B1 – 31-B3 | Garden classification, Pauwel's classification |
| Intracapsular | femoral neck | Basicervical | AO 31-B1 – 31-B3 | Garden classification, Pauwel's classification |
| Extracapsular | Trochanteric | Intertrochanteric (between the greater and lesser trochanter) | AO 31-A1 – 31-A2 | Evans' classification (1949), Ramadier's classification (1956), Boyd and Griffin's classification (1949), Decoulx & Lavarde's classification (1969), Ender's classification (1970), Tronzo's classification (1973), Evans-Jensen classification (1975), Deburge's classification (1976), Briot's classification (1980) |
| Extracapsular | Trochanteric | Pertrochanteric (through the trochanters) | AO 31-A3 | Evans' classification (1949), Ramadier's classification (1956), Boyd and Griffin's classification (1949), Decoulx & Lavarde's classification (1969), Ender's classification (1970), Tronzo's classification (1973), Evans-Jensen classification (1975), Deburge's classification (1976), Briot's classification (1980) |
| Extracapsular | Subtrochanteric | | AO 32 | Seinsheimer classification |

Trochanteric fractures are subdivided into either intertrochanteric (between the greater and lesser trochanter) or pertrochanteric (through the trochanters) by the Müller AO Classification of fractures. Practically, the difference between these types is minor. The terms are often used synonymously. An isolated trochanteric fracture involves one of the trochanters without going through the anatomical axis of the femur, and may occur in young individuals due to forceful muscle contraction.

== Prevention ==
The majority of hip fractures are the result of a fall, particularly in the elderly. Therefore, identifying why the fall occurred, and implementing treatments or changes, is key to reducing the occurrence of hip fractures. Multiple contributing factors are often identified. These can include environmental factors and medical factors (such as postural hypotension or co-existing disabilities from disease such as Stroke or Parkinson's disease which cause visual and/or balance impairments). A recent study has identified a high incidence of undiagnosed cervical spondylotic myelopathy (CSM) amongst patients with a hip fracture. This is relatively unrecognised consequent of CSM.

Additionally, there is some evidence to systems designed to offer protection in the case of a fall. Hip protectors, for example appear to decrease the number of hip fractures among the elderly, but they are often not used.

== Management ==
Most hip fractures are treated surgically by implanting a prosthesis. Surgical treatment outweighs the risks of nonsurgical treatment which requires extensive bedrest. Prolonged immobilization increases risk of thromboembolism, pneumonia, deconditioning, and decubitus ulcers. Regardless, the surgery is a major stress, particularly in the elderly. Pain is also significant, and can also result in immobilization, so patients are encouraged to become mobile as soon as possible, often with the assistance of physical therapy. Skeletal traction pending surgery is not supported by the evidence. Regional nerve blocks are useful for pain management in hip fractures. Peripheral nerve blocks may reduce pain on movement and delirium, may improve time to first mobilisation, and may reduce the risk of postoperative lower respiratory tract infection. Surgery can be performed under general anaesthesia or with neuraxial techniques (spinal anaesthesia) – choice is based on surgical and patient factors, as outcomes such as mortality and post-procedure complications including pneumonia, MI, stroke or delirium, are not affected by anaesthetic technique. This has led to a 2025 evidence update finding that there is no significant difference between spinal and general anesthesia for hip fracture surgery outcomes, including death, walking recovery, delirium, or hospital stay, contradicting earlier studies that suggested spinal anesthesia was superior.

Red blood cell transfusion is common for people undergoing hip fracture surgery due to the blood loss sustained during surgery and from the injury. The benefits of giving blood when the hemoglobin is less than 10 g/dL versus less than 8 g/dL are not clear. Waiting until the hemoglobin was less than 8 g/dL or the person had symptoms may increase the risk of heart problems. Intravenous iron is used in some centres to encourage an increase in haemoglobin levels, but it not known whether this makes a significant difference to outcomes that matter to patients.

If operative treatment is refused or the risks of surgery are considered to be too high the main emphasis of treatment is on pain relief. Skeletal traction may be considered for long-term treatment. Aggressive chest physiotherapy is needed to reduce the risk of pneumonia and skilled rehabilitation and nursing to avoid pressure sores and DVT/pulmonary embolism Most people will be bedbound for several months. Non-operative treatment is may be offered to only the most medically unstable or demented patients or those who are nonambulatory at baseline with minimal pain during transfers. The rates of non-operative management vary considerably between and within countries, and the reasons for choosing non-operative management may be influenced by local (country) cultural factors, attitudes towards risk and specific patient factors.

Surgery on the same day or day following the break is estimated to reduce postoperative mortality in people who are medically stable.

=== Intracapsular fractures ===
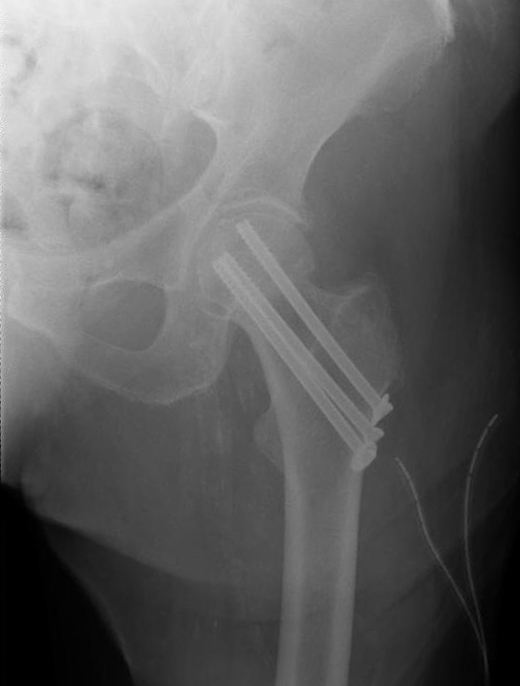
Fracture treated with cannulated screws

For low-grade fractures (Garden types 1 and 2), standard treatment is fixation of the fracture in situ with screws or a sliding screw/plate device. This treatment can also be offered for displaced fractures after the fracture has been reduced.

Fractures managed by closed reduction can possibly be treated by percutaneously inserted screws.

In elderly patients with displaced or intracapsular fractures surgeons may decide to perform a hemiarthroplasty, replacing the broken part of the bone with a metal implant. However, in elderly people who are medically well and still active, a total hip replacement may be indicated. Independently mobile older adults with hip fractures may benefit from a total hip replacement instead of hemiarthroplasty.

Traction is contraindicated in femoral neck fractures due to it affecting blood flow to the head of the femur.

The latest evidence suggests that there may be little or no difference between screws and fixed angle plates as internal fixation implants for intracapsular hip fractures in older adults. The findings are based on low quality evidence that can't firmly conclude major difference in hip function, quality of life, and additional surgery.

=== Trochanteric fracture ===
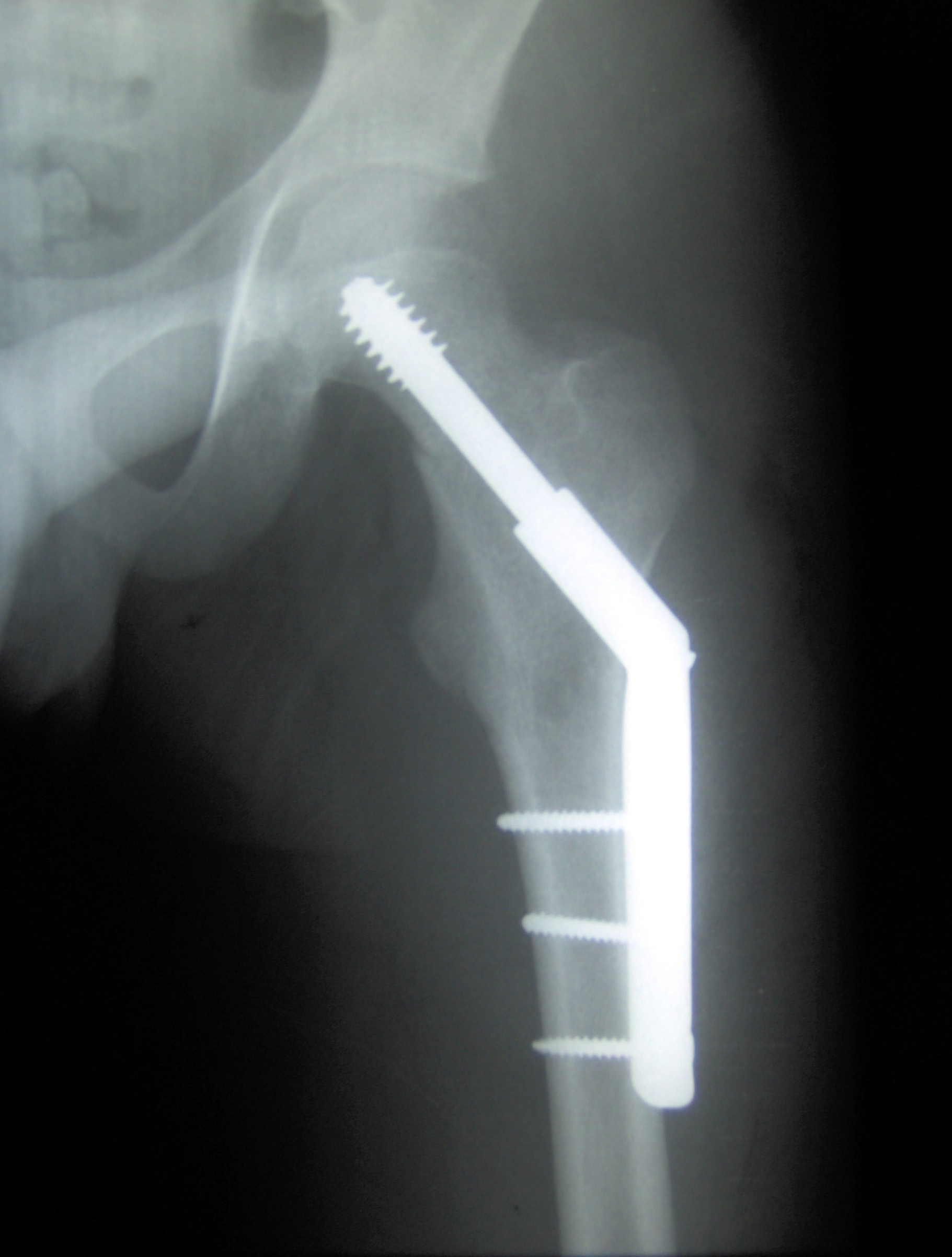
Fracture supported by dynamic hip screw

A trochanteric fracture, below the neck of the femur, has a good chance of healing.

Closed reduction may not be satisfactory and open reduction then becomes necessary. The use of open reduction has been reported as 8-13% among pertrochanteric fractures, and 52% among intertrochanteric fractures. Both intertrochanteric and pertrochanteric fractures may be treated by a dynamic hip screw and plate, or an intramedullary rod.

The fracture typically takes 3–6 months to heal. As it is only common in elderly, removal of the dynamic hip screw is usually not recommended to avoid unnecessary risk of second operation and the increased risk of re-fracture after implant removal. The most common cause for hip fractures in the elderly is osteoporosis; if this is the case, treatment of the osteoporosis can well reduce the risk of further fracture. Only young patients tend to consider having it removed; the implant may function as a stress riser, increasing the risk of a break if another accident occurs.

=== Subtrochanteric fractures ===
Subtrochanteric fractures may be treated with an intramedullary nail or a screw-plate construction and may require traction pre-operatively, though this practice is uncommon. It is unclear if any specific type of nail results in different outcomes than any other type of nail.

A lateral incision over the trochanter is made and a cerclage wire is placed around the fracture for reduction. Once reduction has been achieved a guide canal for the nail is made through the proximal cortex and medullary. The nail is inserted through the canal and is fixated proximally and distally with screws. X-rays are obtained to ensure proper reduction and placement of the nail and screws are achieved.

=== Rehabilitation ===
Rehabilitation has been proven to increase daily functional status. Forty percent of individuals with hip fractures are also diagnosed with dementia or mild cognitive impairment which often results in poorer post-surgical outcomes. In such cases enhanced rehabilitation and care models have been shown to have limited positive effects in reducing delirium and hospital length of stay. It is unclear if the use of anabolic steroids affects recovery.

A updated Cochrane review (2022) involving over 4000 patients found evidence that gait training, balance and functional tasks training to be particularly effective when compared to conventional care. There is also moderate-certainty evidence that rehabilitation after hip fracture surgery, when delivered by a multidisciplinary team and supervised by an appropriate medical specialist, results in fewer cases of 'poor outcome', like death and admission to supported living. There is evidence early mobilisation helps. A UK study analysing data on over 135,000 people who had surgery for hip fracture found that people who get out of bed on the day of hip surgery, or the day after, were twice as likely to leave hospital within 30 days.

=== Nutrition supplementation ===
Oral supplements with non-protein energy, protein, vitamins and minerals started before or early after surgery may prevent complications during the first year after hip fracture in aged adults; without seemingly effects on mortality.

=== Surgical complications ===
Deep or superficial wound infection has an approximate incidence of 2%. It is a serious problem as superficial infection may lead to deep infection. This may cause infection of the healing bone and contamination of the implants. It is difficult to eliminate infection in the presence of metal foreign bodies such as implants. Bacteria inside the implants are inaccessible to the body's defence system and to antibiotics. The management is to attempt to suppress the infection with drainage and antibiotics until the bone is healed. Then the implant should be removed, following which the infection may clear up. Implant failure may occur; the metal screws and plate can break, back out, or cut out superiorly and enter the joint. This occurs either through inaccurate implant placement or if the fixation does not hold in weak and brittle bone. In the event of failure, the surgery may be redone or changed to a total hip replacement. Mal-positioning: The fracture can be fixed and subsequently heal in an incorrect position; especially rotation. This may not be a severe problem or may require subsequent osteotomy surgery for correction.

== Prognosis ==
Hip fractures are very dangerous episodes, especially for elderly and frail patients. The risk of dying from the stress of the surgery and the injury in the first thirty days is about 7%. At one year after fracture, this may reach 30%. If the condition is untreated the pain and immobility imposed on the patient increase that risk. Problems such as pressure sores and chest infections are all increased by immobility. The prognosis of untreated hip fractures is very poor. However, most people who suffer a hip fracture are of relatively low risk of early mortality as deaths are concentrated in a numerically smaller, higher risk group. There are scoring tools available, such as the Nottingham Hip Fracture Score that can provide an estimate of risk based on the factors that are known to place people at higher risk, such as: advanced age; dementia or delirium on admission, anaemia on admission, co-morbidities; not living at home before the fracture; and previous diagnoses of cancer.

=== Post operation ===
Among those affected over the age of 65, 40% are transferred directly to long-term care facilities, long-term rehabilitation facilities, or nursing homes; most of those affected require some sort of living assistance from family or home-care providers. 50% permanently require walkers, canes, or crutches for mobility; all require some sort of mobility assistance throughout the healing process. Most of the recovery of walking ability and activities of daily living occurs within 6 months of the fracture. After the fracture about half of older people recover their pre-fracture level of mobility and ability to perform instrumental activities of daily living, while 40–70% regain their level of independence for basic activities of daily living.

Among those affected over the age of 50, approximately 25% die within the next year due to complications such as blood clots (deep venous thrombosis, pulmonary embolism), infections, and pneumonia.

Patients with hip fractures are at high risk for future fractures including hip, wrist, shoulder, and spine. After treatment of the acute fracture, the risk of future fractures should be addressed. Currently, only 1 in 4 patients after a hip fracture receives treatment and work up for osteoporosis, the underlying cause of most of the fractures. Current treatment standards include the starting of a bisphosphonate to reduce future fracture risk by up to 50%.

== Epidemiology ==
Age-standardised hip fracture rates. Low (<150 / 100,000) Medium (150–250 / 100,000) High (>250 / 100,000)

Hip fractures are seen globally and are a serious concern at the individual and population level. By 2050, it is estimated that there will be six million cases of hip fractures worldwide. One study published in 2001 found that in the US alone, 310,000 individuals were hospitalized due to hip fractures, which can account for 30% of Americans who were hospitalized that year. Another study found that in 2011, femur neck fractures were among the most expensive conditions seen in US hospitals, with an aggregated cost of nearly $4.9 billion for 316,000 inpatient hospitalizations. Rates of hip fractures are declining in the United States, possibly due to increased use of bisphosphonates and risk management. Falling, poor vision, weight, and height are all seen as risk factors. Falling is one of the most common risk factors for hip fractures. Approximately 90% of hip fractures are attributed to falls from standing height.

Given the high morbidity and mortality associated with hip fractures and the cost to the health system, in England and Wales, the National Hip Fracture Database is a mandatory nationwide audit of care and treatment of all hip fractures.

=== Population ===
All populations experience hip fractures but numbers vary with race, gender, and age. Women have three times as many hip fractures as men. In a lifetime, men have an estimated 6% risk whereas postmenopausal women have an estimated 14% risk of having a hip fracture. These statistics provide insight over a lifespan, and conclude that women are twice as likely to have a hip fracture. The overwhelming majority of hip fractures occur in white individuals, while blacks and Hispanics have a lower rate of them. This may be due to their generally greater bone density and also because whites have longer overall lifespan and higher likelihood of reaching an advanced age where the risk of breaking a hip goes up. Deprivation is also a key factor: in England, it has been found that people in the poorest parts of the country are more likely to fracture a hip and less likely to recover well than those in the least deprived areas.

=== Age related ===
Age is the most dominant factor in hip fracture injuries, with most cases occurring in people over 75. The increase of age is related to the increase of the incidence of hip fracture, which is the most frequent cause of hospitalization in centenarians, overcoming congestive heart failure and respiratory infection. Falls are the most common cause of hip fractures; around 30–60% of older adults fall each year. This increases the risk for hip fracture and leads to the increased risk of death in older individuals, the rate of one year mortality is seen from 12 to 37%. For those remaining patients, half of them need assistance and cannot live independently. Also, older adults sustain hip fractures because of osteoporosis, which is a degenerative disease due to age and decrease in bone mass. The average age for sustaining a hip fracture is 77 years old for women and 72 years old for men.
