= National Hip Fracture Database =

The National Hip Fracture Database (NHFD) is a nationwide audit within the NHS concerning the management and outcomes of patients with hip fractures.

It was initially set up by the British Orthopaedic Association and the British Geriatrics Society, however it is now commissioned by the Healthcare Quality Improvement Partnership (HQIP), a consortium of the Academy of Medical Royal Colleges and the Royal College of Nursing which holds the contract to manage and develop the National Clinical Audit and Patient Outcomes Programme (NCAPOP), as part of the Falls and Fragility Fracture Audit Programme (FFFAP) of the Royal College of Physicians, in association with the BOA, BGS, Royal College of Surgeons of England and the Falls and Fractures Alliance (composed of Age UK and the National Osteoporosis Society).

== Design ==
The NHFD aims to improve the quality and effectiveness of hip fracture care by enabling clinical teams to monitor their performance against agreed clinical standards from the BOA and BGS 'Blue Book' publication, in addition to compliance with NICE Guidance 124 - ‘The Management of Hip Fracture in Adults’.

Data collected includes:

- Fracture type
- Operation performed
- Length of stay
- Morbidity and mortality

== Reports ==
The NHFD has reported nationally annually since 2010

In addition, quarterly reports are generated to allow for best practice tariff payments against the following criteria:

- Time to orthopaedic ward
- Time to surgery
- Time to orthogeriatric review
- Pre- and post-operative AMTS
- Osteoporosis assessment
- Falls assessment
