= Femoral head fracture =

Fracture of the upper end of the thigh bone

A femoral head fracture is a rare type of hip fracture that involves a break in the rounded portion of the thigh bone (femur) that fits into the hip socket. They are estimated to account for less than 1% of all hip fractures, with two-thirds of those affected being young adults. These injuries are typically sustained during high-impact events, such as car accidents or falls from significant heights.

== Signs and symptoms ==
Typical presenting findings include pain in the groin, along with swelling and bruising around the hip. Patients are generally unable to walk or bear weight on the affected leg. Femoral head fractures also commonly occur in association with posterior hip dislocation. In these cases, the affected leg is usually in a flexed, adducted, and internally rotated position. The affected leg may appear shorter compared to the unaffected leg. Sciatic nerve injury can also occur, especially in cases of fracture with dislocation. This may manifest with absent or diminished reflexes and weakness when bending the knee or moving the foot.

== Diagnosis ==
=== Imaging ===
Plain radiographs of the pelvis taken from the front (AP view) are the initial imaging method of choice for isolated injuries. Additional views can help identify accompanying injuries, such as acetabular fractures. CT scans are often used in trauma patients with multiple serious injuries or after reduction to further evaluate the hip joint. MRI may be used if there is suspected damage to the cartilage of the hip socket or suspected early osteonecrosis.

=== Classification ===
The Pipkin classification is the most frequently used method to categorize femoral head fractures and is organized as follows:

Pipkin classification type	Description
I	Fracture below the fovea; not involving weight-bearing surface of the head
II	Fracture above the fovea; involving weight-bearing surface of the head
III	Type I or II fracture with associated femoral neck fracture
IV	Type I or II fracture with associated acetabulum fracture

This classification system helps to guide management and predict outcomes.

== Treatment ==
Initial physical examination should include assessment of circulation and nerve function in the affected leg, particularly in the distribution of the sciatic nerve. In cases with hip dislocation, urgent reduction is required, with earlier intervention being predictive of a better outcome. Definitive management in younger patients may involve surgical options such as open reduction and internal fixation or fragment removal. In contrast, total hip replacement is generally favored in elderly patients.

== Prognosis ==
There are multiple scoring systems used to assess outcomes following recovery, including the Thompson and Epstein outcome score, Merle d'Aubigné and Postel score, and the Oxford Hip Score. Using these scoring systems, good to excellent outcomes are achieved in about two-thirds of cases. However, the association of the injury with pain, joint stiffness, and loss of function contributes to variability in treatment outcomes. Common long-term complications include posttraumatic arthritis, osteonecrosis of the femoral head, and heterotopic ossification.

== Epidemiology ==
Although still uncommon, the incidence of femoral head fractures has increased in recent times. This trend is thought to be the result of two main factors: an increase in motor vehicle accidents and advances in modern vehicle safety, which have increased survival and allowed for more frequent identification of these fractures.

== See also ==
- Femoral neck
