= Oxford Hip Score =

Patient reported outcome questionnaire

The Oxford Hip Score (OHS) is a standard patient-reported outcome (PRO) measure, or PROM, developed to assess function and pain in patients undergoing total hip replacement (THR) surgery, particularly in the context of clinical trials. The OHS has also been used for the assessment of patient outcomes, including physical therapy, and use of joint supplements(disease specific and general health measure are two other outcome measures)

== History ==
The OHS was designed and developed by researchers within the Health Services Research Unit (HSRU) of the UK Department of Public Health, in association with the Nuffield Orthopaedic Centre. The OHS contains 12 questions covering aspects of hip pain and function, and is reproducible, valid and sensitive to clinically relevant changes. It is a self-assessment measure, designed to be completed by the patient; this avoids influences that might unwittingly be introduced by the surgeon or a clinical team .

The OHS is the most commonly used patient-reported hip specific measure available, because it can be completed anywhere.

The OHS and the Oxford Knee Score (OKS) were both adopted by the UK Department of Health for the assessment of hip and knee replacement operations carried out each year in National Health Service hospitals. The OHS and OKS form part of the nationwide Patient Reported Outcome Measure program.
