= Extracapsular fracture =

Medical condition

An extracapsular fracture is a bone fracture near a joint but still located outside the joint capsule.

Examples of extracapsular fractures are intertrochanteric and subtrochanteric hip fractures.

== See also ==
- Intracapsular fracture
