= Müller AO Classification of fractures =

System for classifying bone fractures

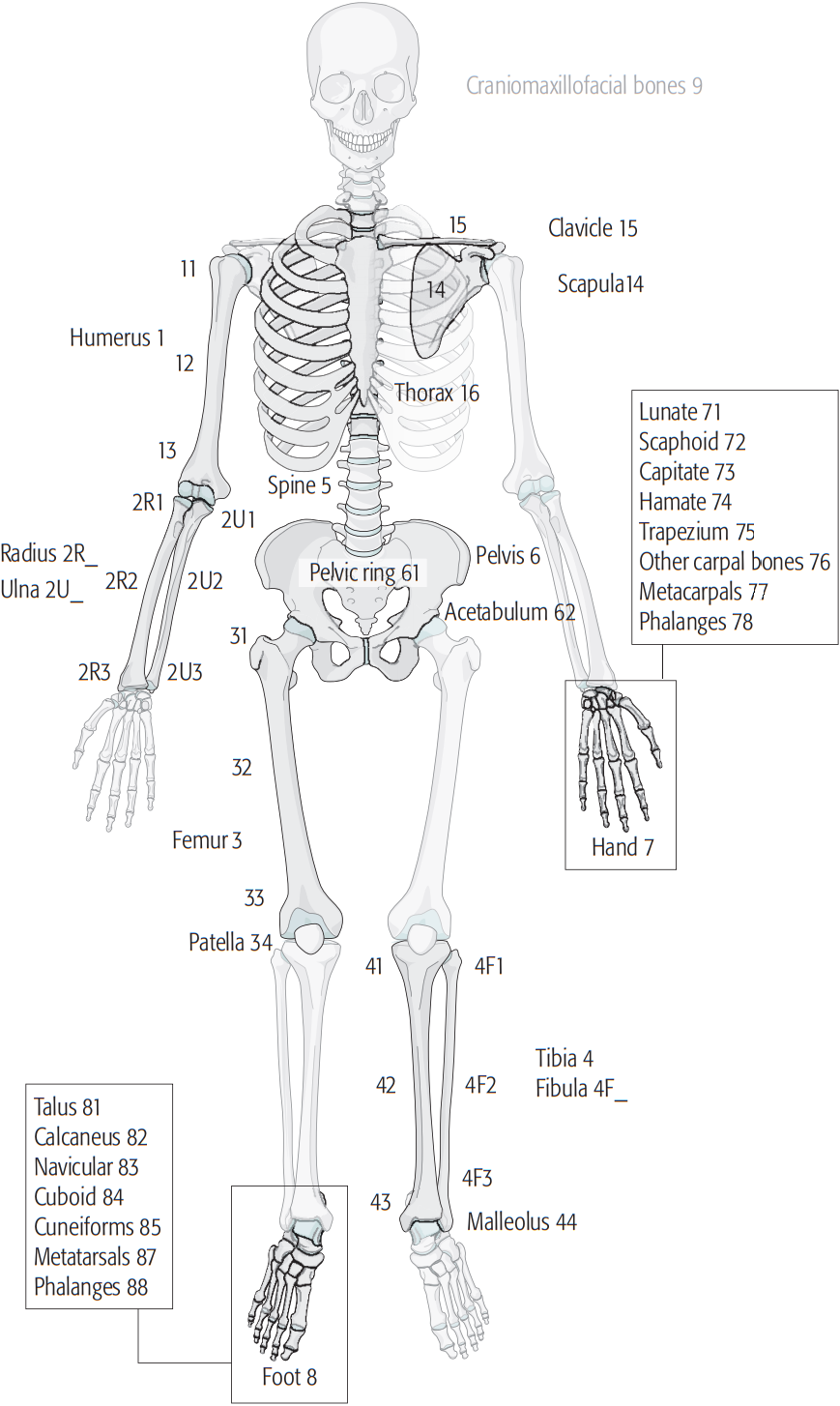
AO classification

The Müller AO Classification of fractures is a system for classifying bone fractures initially published in 1987 by the AO Foundation as a method of categorizing injuries according to therognosis of the patient's anatomical and functional outcome. "AO" is an initialism for the German "Arbeitsgemeinschaft für Osteosynthesefragen", the predecessor of the AO Foundation.

It is one of the few complete fracture classification systems to remain in use today after validation.

== Comprehensive classification of the long bones ==
The English language version of the system allows consistent in detail description of a fracture in defined terminology by creating a 5-element alphanumeric code:

Localisation		Morphology		
Bone	Segment	Type	Group	Subgroup
1/2/3/4	1/2/3/(4)	A/B/C	1/2/3	.1/.2/.3

=== Localisation ===
First, each fracture is given 2 numbers to describe which bone it affects, and where in the bone:

	1	2	3	4
Bone	Humerus	Radius and Ulna	Femur	Tibia and fibula
Segment	Proximal segment	Diaphyseal segment	Distal segment	Malleolar segment (only used with tibia and fibula

=== Type ===
Each fracture is next given a letter (A, B or C) to describe the joint involvement of the fracture:

Segment	A	B	C
1	Extra-articular	Partial articular	Complete articular
2	Simple	Wedge	Complex
3	Extra-articular	Partial articular	Complete articular

The exceptions to this step include:

Localisation	A	B	C
11 - Proximal humerus	Extra-articular, unifocal	Extra-articular, bifocal	Articular
31 - Proximal femur	Extra-articular, trochanteric	Extra-articular, neck	Articular, head
44 - Malleoli	Infrasydesmotic	Transyndesmotic	Suprasyndesmotic

=== Groups & Subgroups ===
Finally, the fracture is given 2 further numbers to denote the fracture pattern and geometry.

For segment 2 (diaphyseal) fractures:

Type	Group		
Type	1	2	3
A - simple	Spiral	Oblique	Transverse
B - wedge	Spiral	Bending	Multifragmentory
C - complex	Spiral	Segmental	Irregular

For segment 1 and 3 (epiphyseal and metaphyseal) fractures:

Type	Group		
Type	1	2	3
A - extra-articular	Simple	Wedge	Complex
B - partial articular	Split	Depression	Split-depression
C - articular	Simple articular, simple metaphyseal	Simple articular, complex metaphyseal	Complex articular, complex metaphyseal

Subgroups are then used to describe the fractures in terms of displacement (versus apposition, which is the degree to which the parts are in contact with each other), rotation, angulation and shortening.

== AO pediatric comprehensive classification of long bone fractures ==
A pediatric version of the long-bone classification was published in 2006 to further classify fractures of immature bone and so the effects on future growth:

Localisation			Morphology		
Bone	Segment	Type	Child	Severity	Exceptions
1/2/3/4	1/2/3	E/M/D	1-9	.1/.2	I-IV

== OTA/AO Classification unifying extension ==
The Orthopaedic Trauma Association Committee for Coding and Classification initially published their classification system covering the whole skeleton in 1996. In 2006 they published a revision, unifying the Muller/AO and OTA systems into a single alphanumeric classification, which has been further updated in 2018:

Localisation		Region/Bone
Bone	Segment	Region/Bone
1	4	Scapula
1	5	Clavicle
3	4	Patella
5	1	Cervical spine
5	2	Thoracic spine
5	3	Lumbar spine
6	1	Pelvic ring
6	2	Acetabulum
7	1	Lunate
7	2	Scaphoid
7	3	Capitate
7	4	Hamate
7	5	Triquetrum and Pisiform
7	6	Trapezium and Trapezoid
7	7	Metacarpus
7	8	Phalanges
7	9	Multiple fractures
8	1	Talus
8	2	Calcaneus
8	3	Navicular
8	4	Cuboid
8	5	Cuneiforms
8	7	Metatarsus
8	8	Phalanges
8	9	Multiple fractures
9	1	Craniomidface
9	2	Mandible
