= Intracapsular fracture =

Medical condition

An intracapsular fracture is a bone fracture located within the joint capsule. Examples of intracapsular fractures includes:

- In the hip: Fractures of the femoral head and femoral neck. These may be classified via Garden classification or Pauwel's classification system.
- In the shoulder: Fracture of the anatomical neck of the humerus, with or without impaction or dislocation, and sometimes with a complicating tuberosity fracture

== See also ==
- Extracapsular fracture
- Intraarticular fracture
