= British Orthopaedic Association =

- Abbreviation: BOA
- Formation: 1918; 108 years ago
- Founder: Harry Platt
- Registration no.: 3482958
- Location: 38-43 Lincoln's Inn Fields, London
- Region served: United Kingdom
- Members: 4,000 (2013)
- President: Simon Hodkinson
- Website: www.boa.ac.uk

The British Orthopaedic Association is a professional association in Britain for doctors who specialize in orthopaedic surgery.

== History ==
The British Orthopaedic Association was founded in 1918. One of the founders was Harry Platt, who went on to serve as its president in 1934-1935.

As of 2013 the organisation reports having 4,000 members with most based in the United Kingdom and Ireland. The BOA represents 40% of the total surgical workforce in Britain.

In 1919 the Journal of Bone and Joint Surgery became the official journal of the British Orthopaedic Association in addition to the American Orthopedic Association.

== Projects ==
In 2012 Royal College of Surgeons of England and the British Orthopaedic Association called for increased regulation of implants to prevent implant failure.

In association with the BGS, the BOA set up the National hip fracture database for England and Wales.

== See also ==
- Maud Forrester-Brown
