= Acetabulum (disambiguation) =

Acetabulum is the concave surface of the pelvis.

Acetabulum may also refer to:

- Acetabulum (cup), ancient vinegar cup
- Acetabulum (morphology), organ of attachment in some worms
- Acetabulum (unit), Roman measurement
