= Hilgenreiner's line =

Diagnostic aid in pelvis radiographs

Hilgenreiner's line is a horizontal line drawn on an AP radiograph of the pelvis running between the inferior aspects of both triradiate cartilages of the acetabulums. It is named for Heinrich Hilgenreiner.

== Clinical use ==
Used in conjunction with Perkin's line or the acetabular angle, Hilgenreiner's line is useful in the diagnosis of developmental dysplasia of the hip.
