= Perkin's line =

Diagnostic aid in pelvis radiographs

Perkin's line is a line drawn on an AP radiograph of the pelvis perpendicular to Hilgenreiner's line at the lateral aspects of the triradiate cartilage of the acetabulum.

== Clinical use ==
Used in conjunction with Hilgenreiner's line, Perkin's line is useful in the diagnosis of developmental dysplasia of the hip; the upper femoral epiphysis should be in the inferomedial quadrant on a normal radiograph. Lateral displacement relative to Perkin's line is indicative of DDH.
