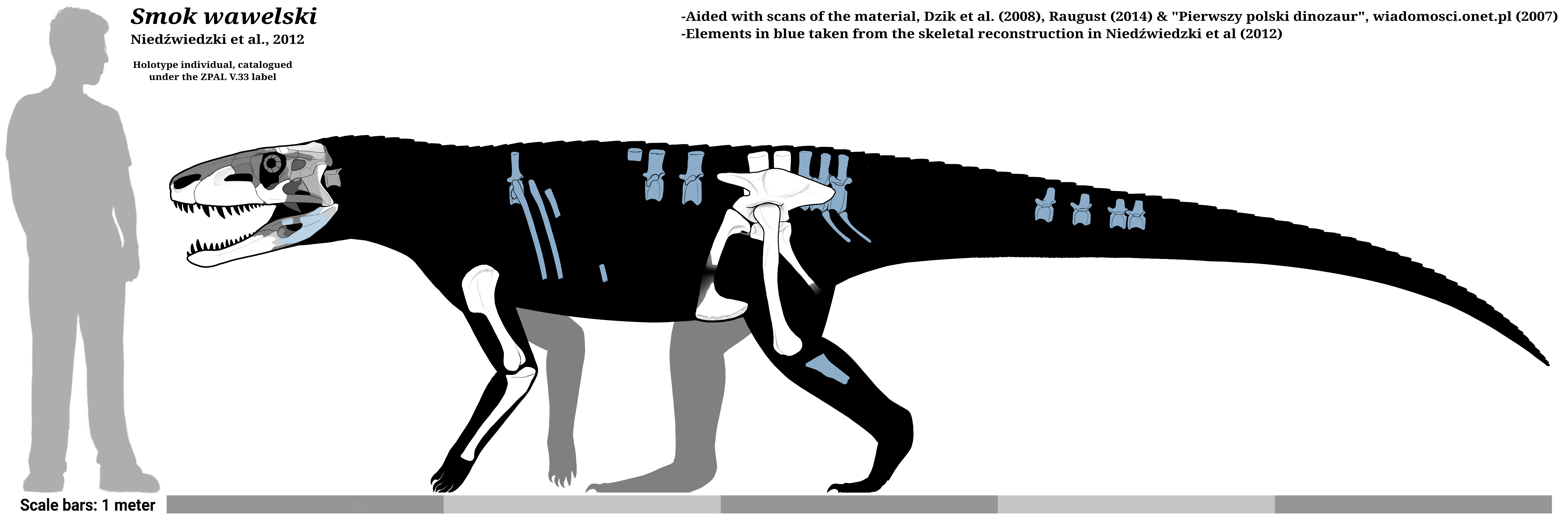
- Skeletal reconstruction showcasing known remains
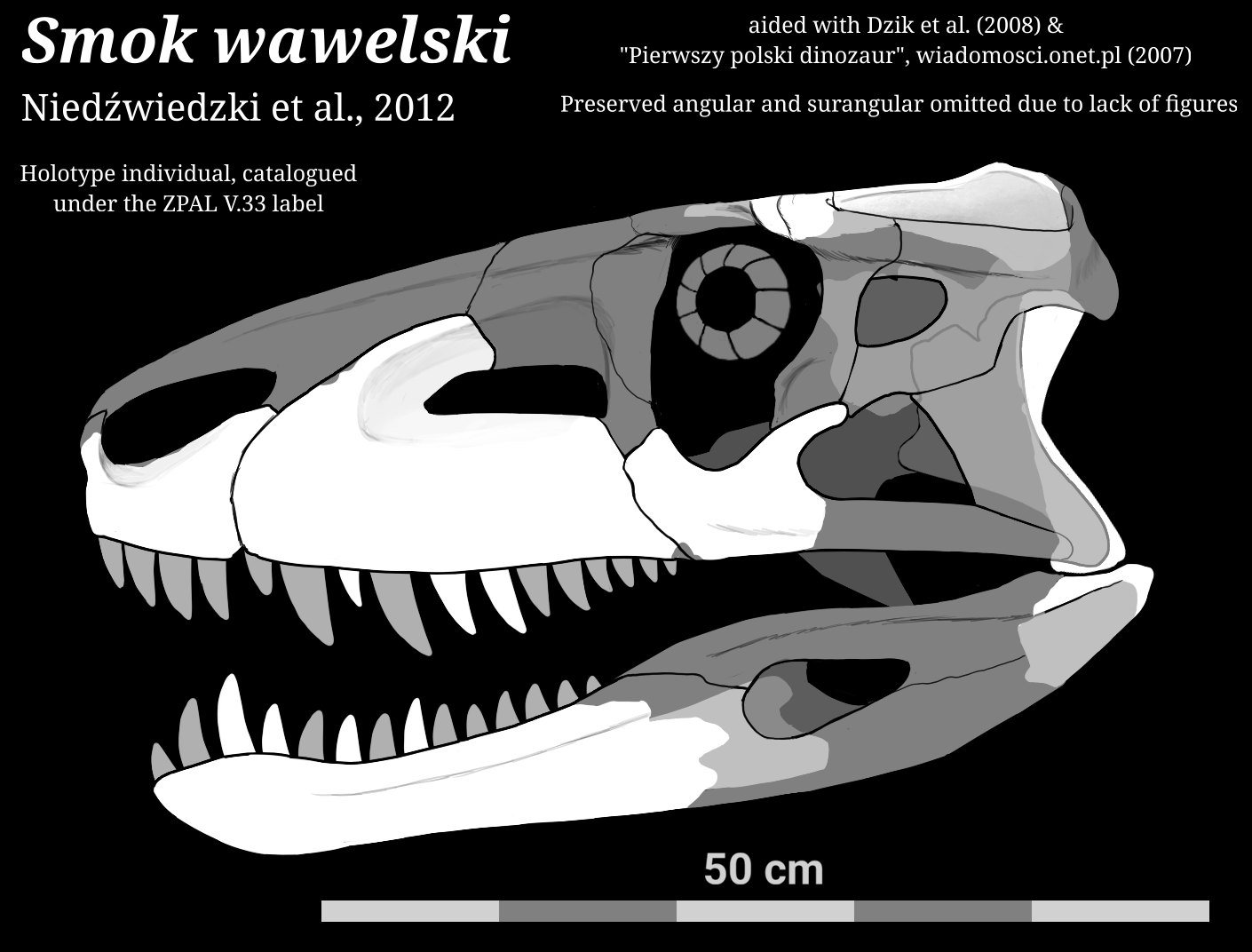
- Skull diagram

Scientific classification
- Kingdom: Animalia
- Phylum: Chordata
- Class: Reptilia
- Clade: Pseudosuchia
- Clade: Paracrocodylomorpha
- Genus: †Smok; Niedźwiedzki et al., 2012
- Species: †S. wawelski

Binomial name
- †Smok wawelski Niedźwiedzki et al., 2012

= Smok wawelski =

Smok wawelski Temporal range: Late Triassic, 208.5–205 Ma

Extinct species of reptiles

Smok (meaning "dragon" in Polish) is an extinct genus of large carnivorous pseudosuchian. It lived during the latest Triassic period (latest Norian to early Rhaetian stage, between 208.5 and 205 Ma). Its remains have been found in Lisowice, southern Poland. The only species is Smok wawelski (after the Wawel Dragon, a dragon from Polish folklore) and was named in 2012. It is larger than any other known predatory archosaur from the Late Triassic or Early Jurassic of central Europe. The relation of Smok to other archosaurs has not yet been thoroughly studied; it was originally identified as an early theropod dinosaur, but published anatomical characteristics indicate it was likely a paracrocodylomorph pseudosuchian (related to modern crocodilians) instead.

== Description ==
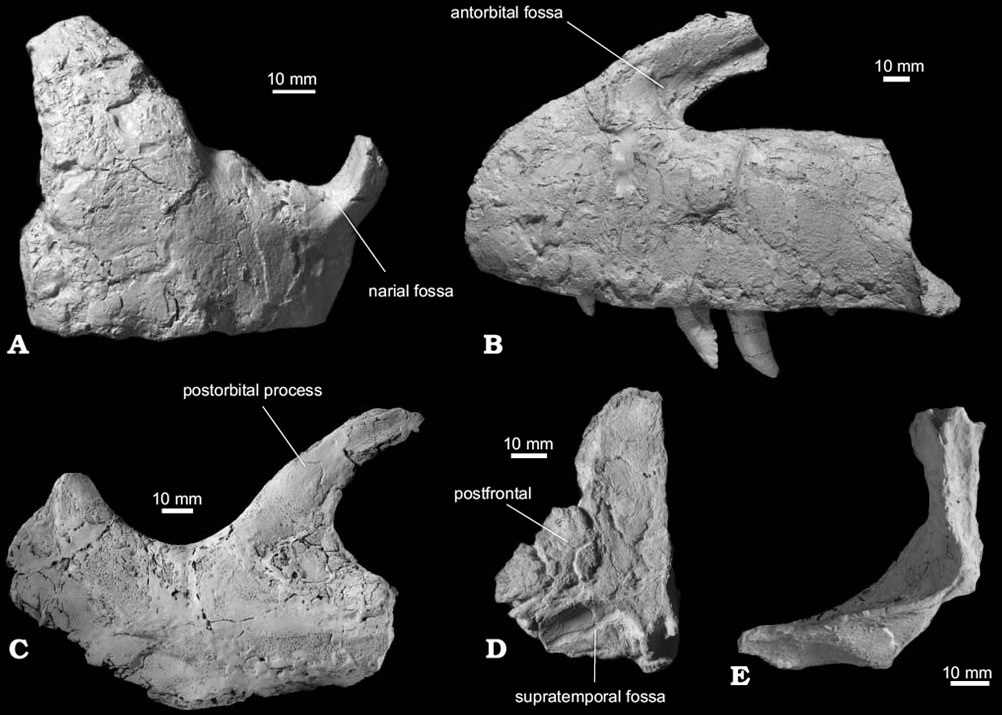
Cranial elements in several views

At an estimated 5 to 6 metres (16 to 20 ft) in length, Smok was the largest carnivorous archosaur in central Europe in the time it was alive. It was larger than any other known theropod dinosaur or pseudosuchian living in central Europe during either the Late Triassic or Early Jurassic. The skull is 50 to 60 centimetres (20 to 24 in) long.

Several features indicate that Smok is an archosaur, including serrated teeth, a contact between the jugal and quadratojugal bones at the back of the skull, a hole in front of the eye socket called the antorbital fenestra, maxillae bones in the upper jaw that connect along their palatal processes, and a rounded projection on the upper part of the femur bone.

The braincase of Smok includes many derived (advanced) features. The most prominent of these is a funnel-shaped structure on the bottom of the braincase, formed by a very wide, rounded basisphenoid bone. A deep notch called the basisphenoid recess cuts into the back of this funnel. Above the funnel is a very thin area of the braincase that is formed by deep depressions on the basisphenoids.

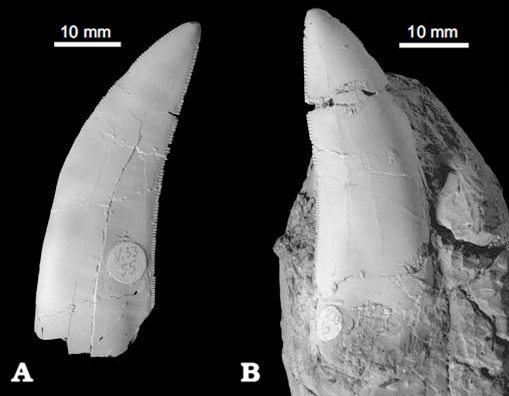
Isolated teeth.

Similarities between Smok and theropods include a groove, or antitrochanter, on the ilium bone of the hip that is part of the acetabulum (a depression where the head of the femur attaches to the hip). Smok and theropods also have an anterior trochanter on the femur. Some large theropods share with Smok the deep depressions of the basisphenoids in the braincase. Although, shared rauisuchians include a triangular antorbital fenestra and a connection between the ectopterygoid and jugal bones of the skull that is split into two projections. The hip of Smok has a ridge on the lateral surface of the ilium above the acetabulum. This ridge is a defining characteristic of rauisuchians, forming a buttress over the femur and giving these animals a pillar-erect stance.

== Discovery and naming ==
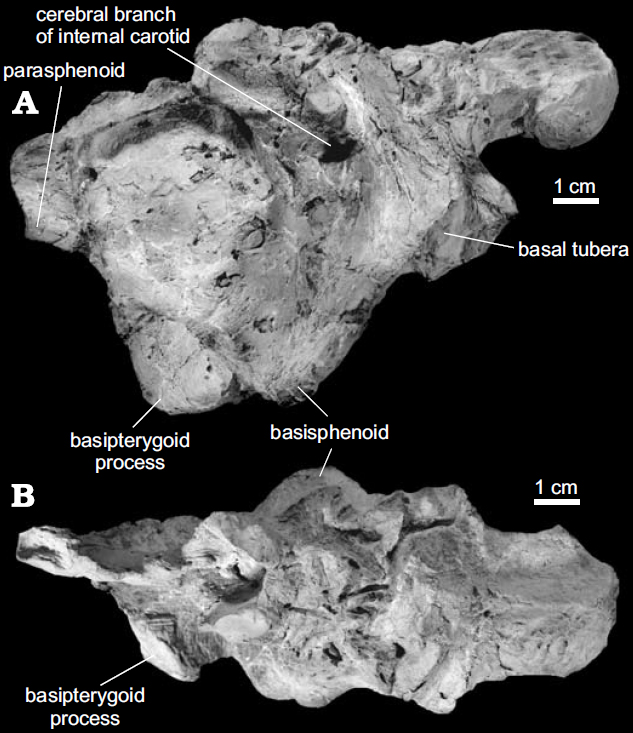
Braincase

Smok was found in a locality near Lisowice village that is latest Norian to early Rhaetian in age. This area was known to contain Triassic fossils since it was formally described in 2008. The first material of Smok, the jawbone and fragments of the skull, was discovered in 2007. It was first described in 2008 as a theropod dinosaur based on features in its braincase and frontal bone. The material was also thought to represent two individuals. Similarities were noted between the braincase of the animal and that of allosauroids. When the discovery was first announced, it was called "the Dragon of Lisowice" and was purported to be the first member of a line of dinosaurs that led to Tyrannosaurus rex. Bones from other parts of the body were found in 2009 and 2010. Five tracks made by a three-toed archosaur – presumably a theropod dinosaur – were found in rocks that were 1 metre (3.3 ft) above the layer where Smok was found. The footprints may belong to Smok, but the lack of foot bones in the skeleton make this association uncertain.

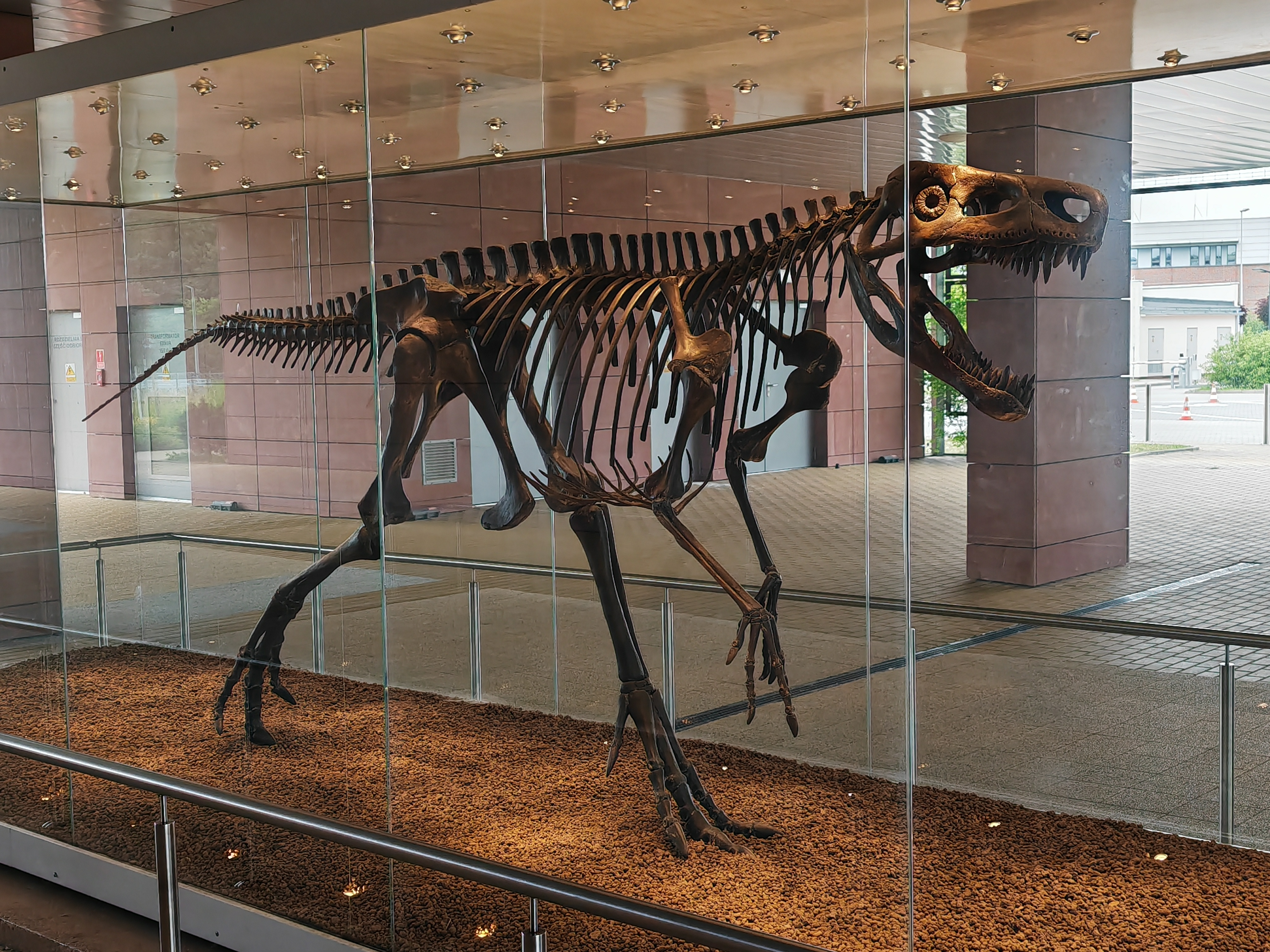
Reconstructed skeleton as a theropod dinosaur, Jagiellonian University, Kraków, Poland

Smok is known from the holotype ZPAL V.33/15, a partially complete braincase which is associated with a partially preserved skeleton, including cranial and postcranial bones from the referred materials ZPAL V.33/16-56, 97–102, 295–314, 434 and 507. All specimens were found in the same location (Lipie Śląskie clay-pit Formation) and probably represent a single individual. It was first named by Grzegorz Niedźwiedzki, Tomasz Sulej and Jerzy Dzik in 2012 after the mythological Polish dragon of the same name that lived in a cave. The cave was on Wawel Hill, the namesake of the type species S. wawelski. Other potential specimens of the genus, identified as Smok sp., have also been discovered in southern Poland.

== Paleobiology ==
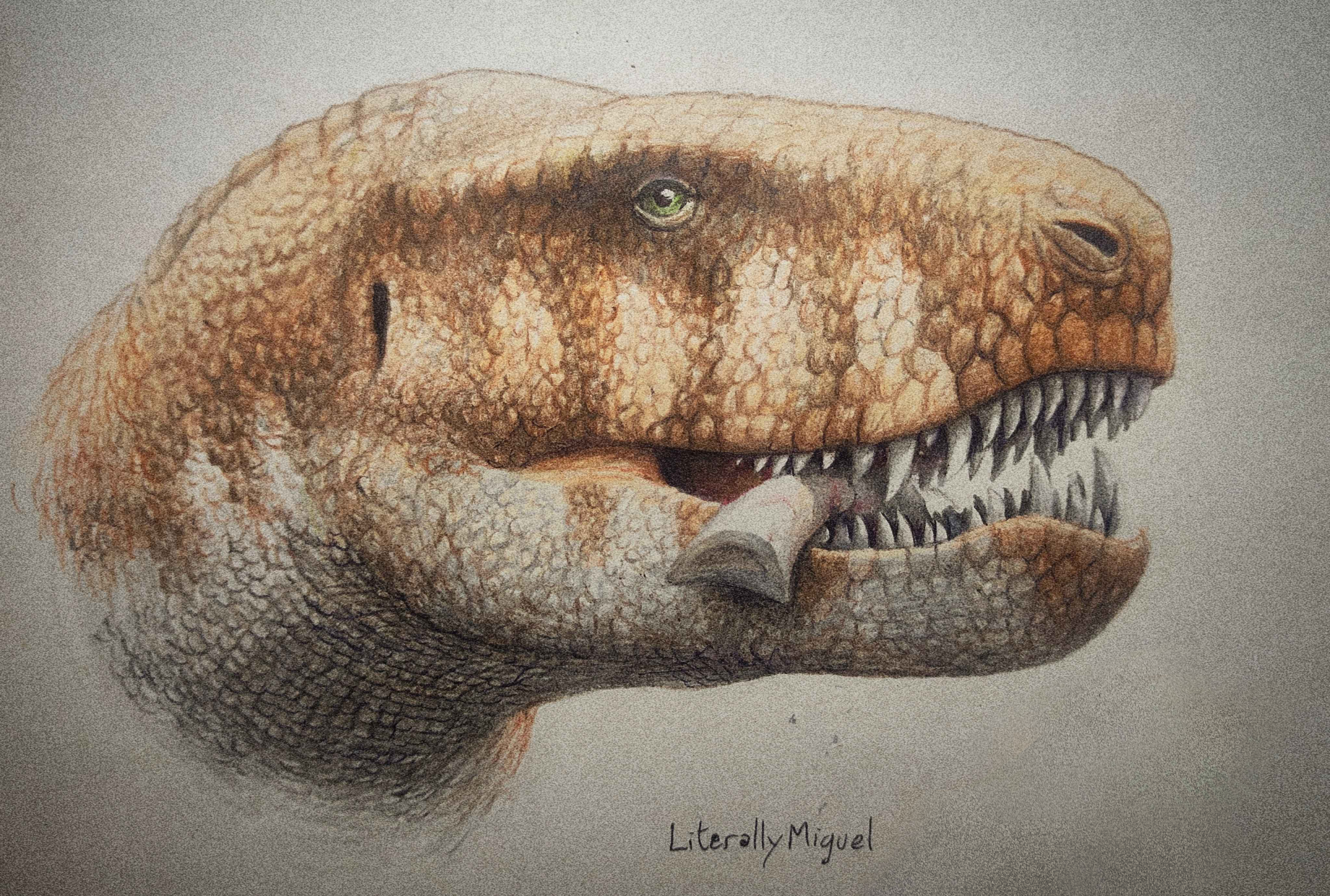
Color pencil illustration of Smok during osteophagy

Examination of coprolites attributed to Smok by Martin Qvarnström et al. (2019) indicate that this archosaur was able to crush bone. Based on examination of the bone fragments within the coprolites, Smok's ability to retain food within its digestive system varied considerably based on prey availability and food type. The variable mixture of bones, some belonging to fish, others to dicynodonts, and to temnospondyls indicates Smok was a generalized predator. Teeth from this archosaur were also uncovered from these trace fossils, indicating it may have swallowed its own broken teeth during feeding. The heavy amounts of bone in the diet indicate that salt and marrow from the bones of herbivores and other prey items was an important component in the archosaur's diet; an important behavior often linked with modern mammalian predators but seldom studied in ancient archosaurian reptiles. The findings were published in the journal Scientific Reports in 2019.

== Paleoecology ==
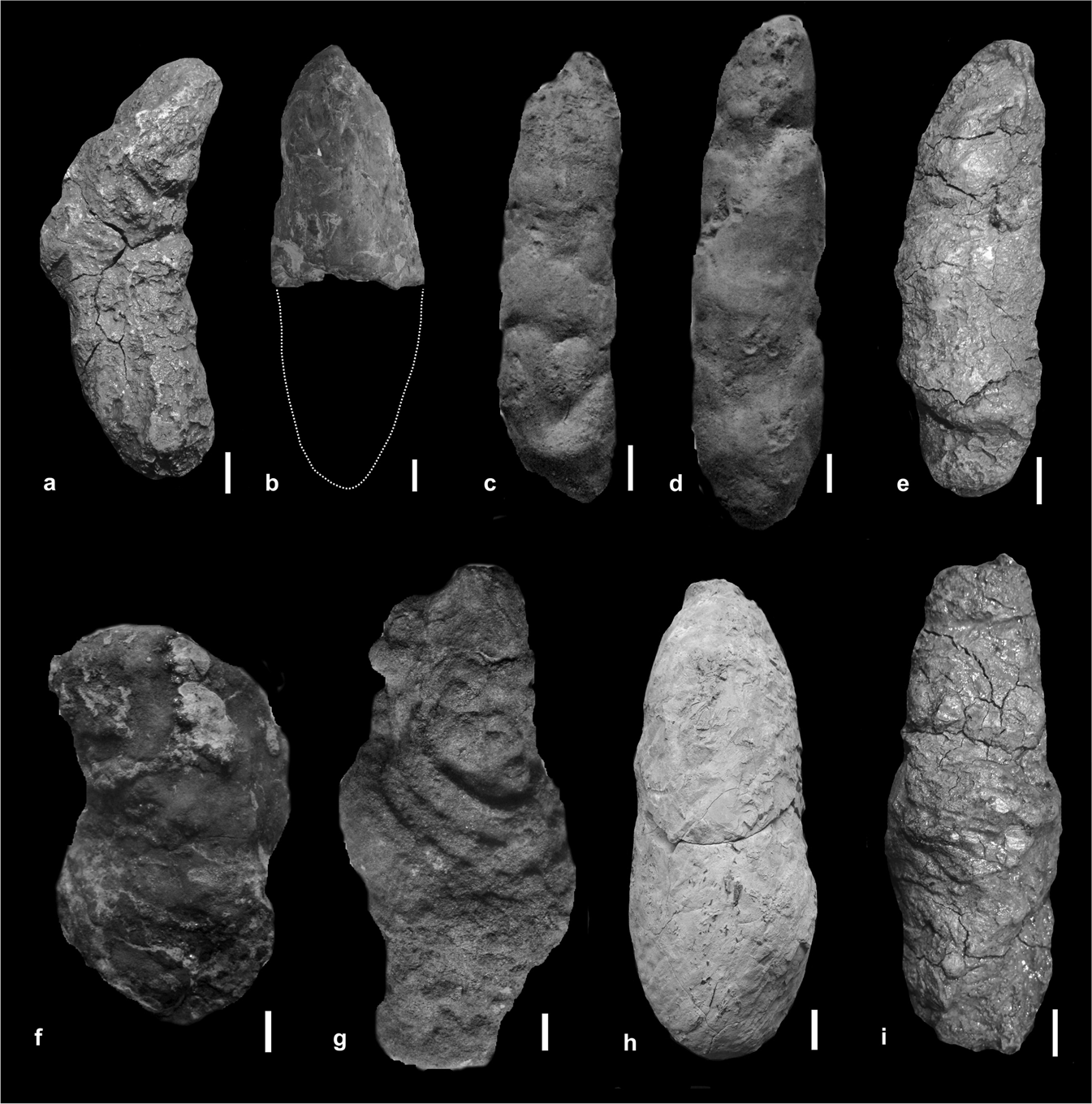
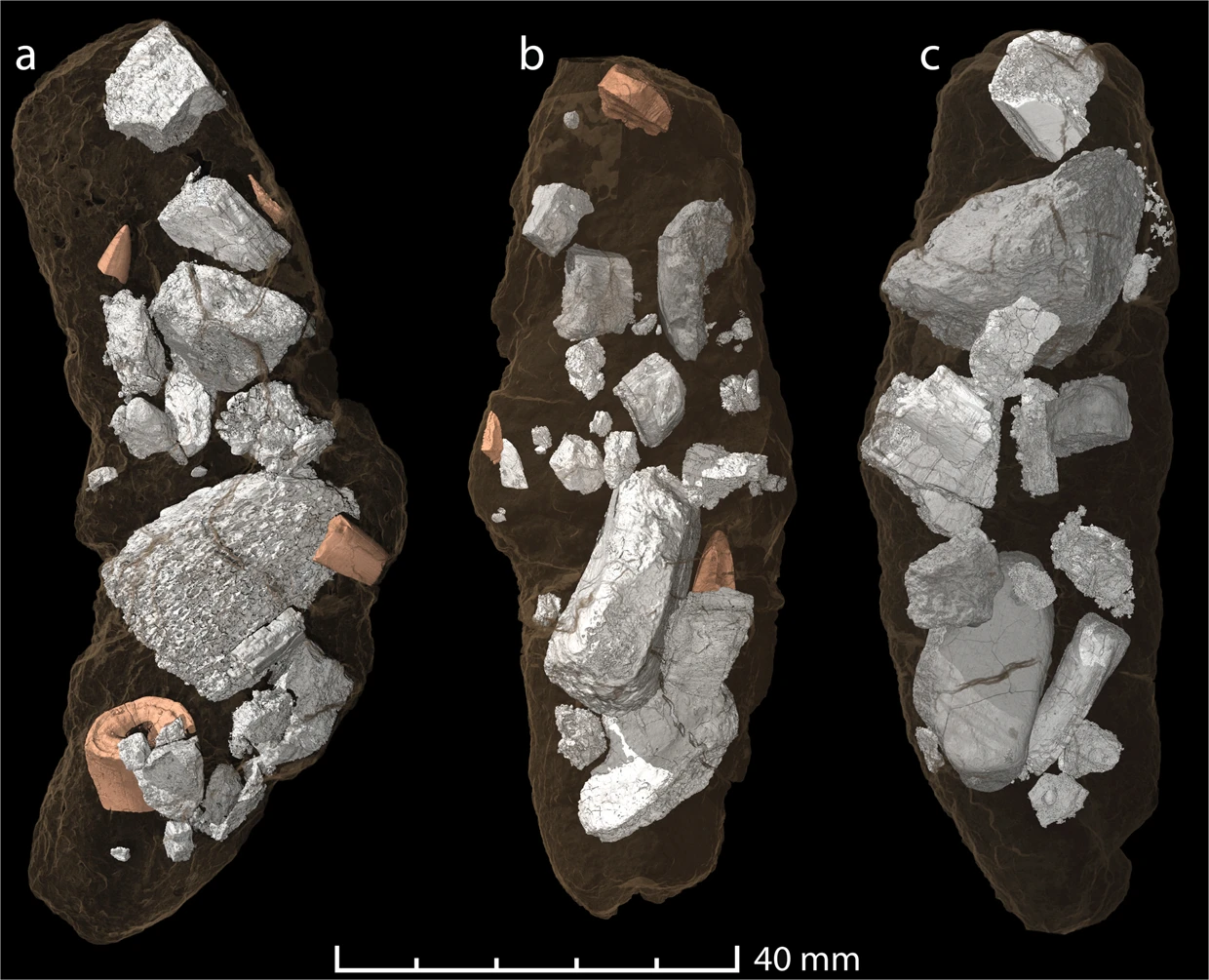
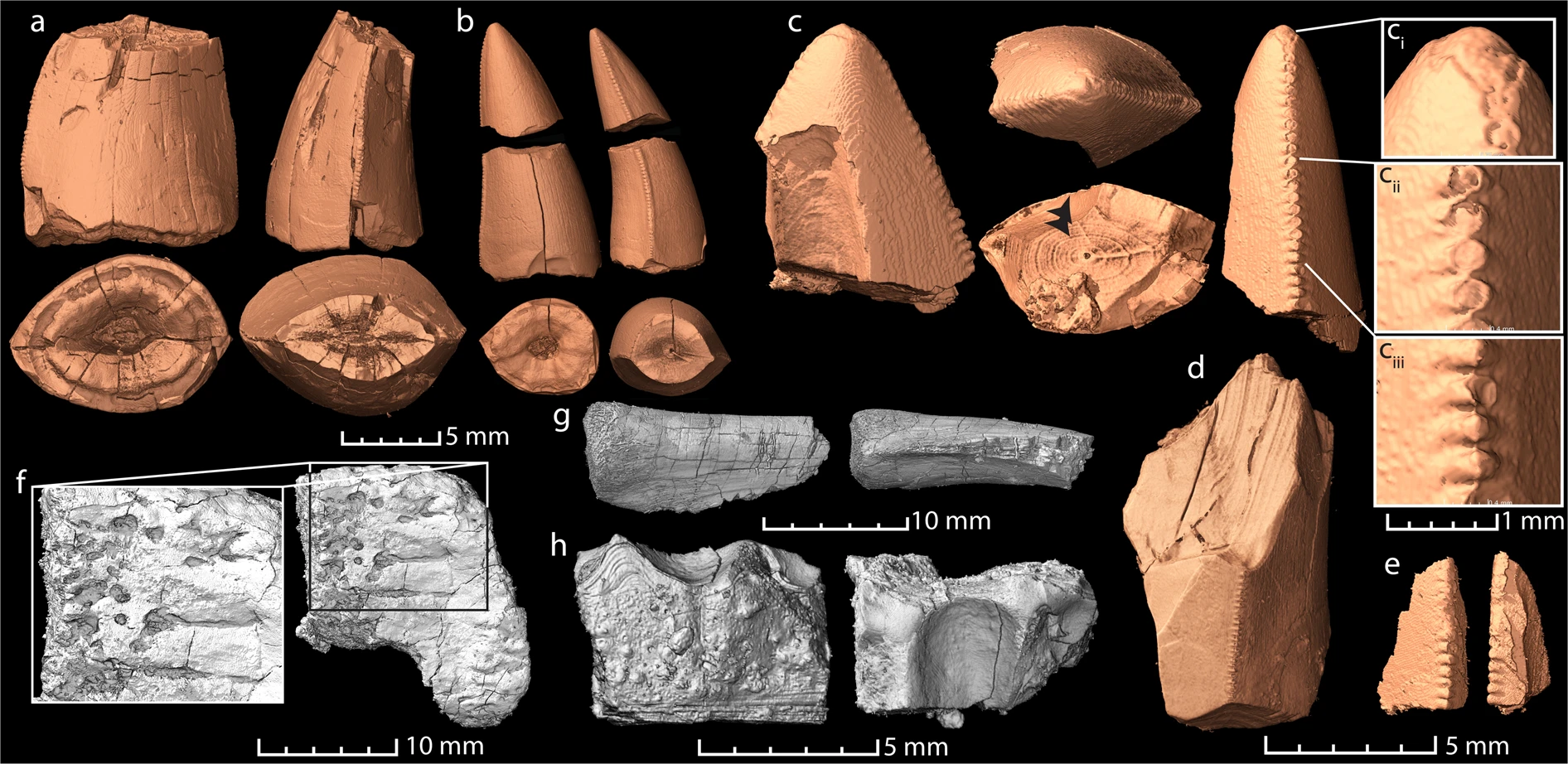
Smok coprolites with scans showing bones and tooth fragments inside them

Smok was the largest predator in its environment. Other large predatory archosaurs included the dinosaur Liliensternus and the rauisuchids Polonosuchus and Teratosaurus, but these animals were much smaller than Smok. It was one of the largest archosaurs in the world during the Late Triassic, and larger archosaurs did not appear until after the Early Jurassic. Smok lived alongside small carnivorous dinosauromorph and poposauroid archosaurs and large herbivorous dicynodonts.
