= Lisowice, Silesian Voivodeship =

Lisowice
- Village
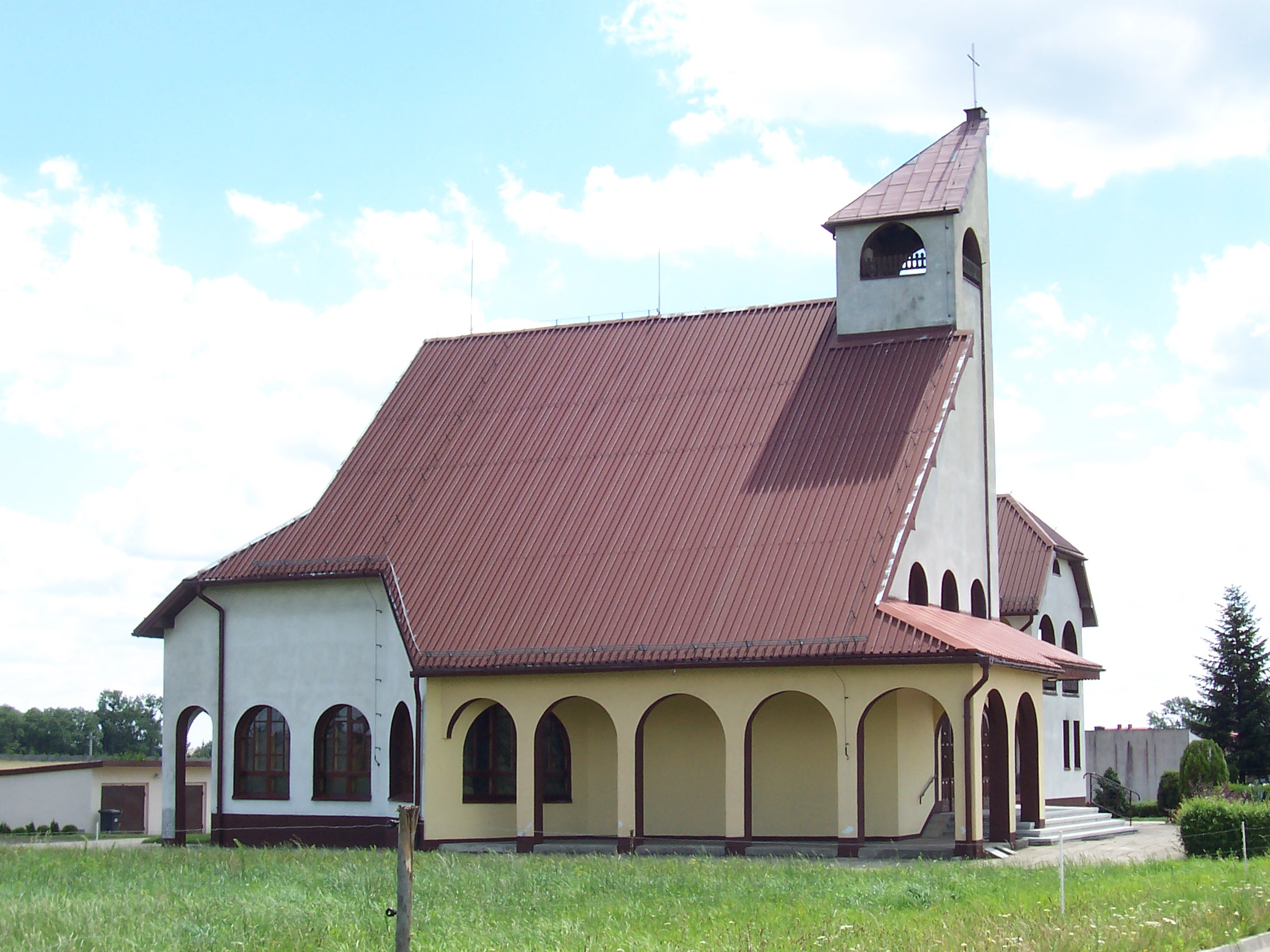
- Church at Lisowice.

- Location within Poland
- Coordinates: 50°40′N 18°37′E
- Country: Poland
- Voivodeship: Silesian
- County: Lubliniec
- Gmina: Pawonków
- Website: http://www.lisowice.com

Lisowice [lisɔˈvit͡sɛ] is a village in the administrative district of Gmina Pawonków, within Lubliniec County, Silesian Voivodeship, in southern Poland.

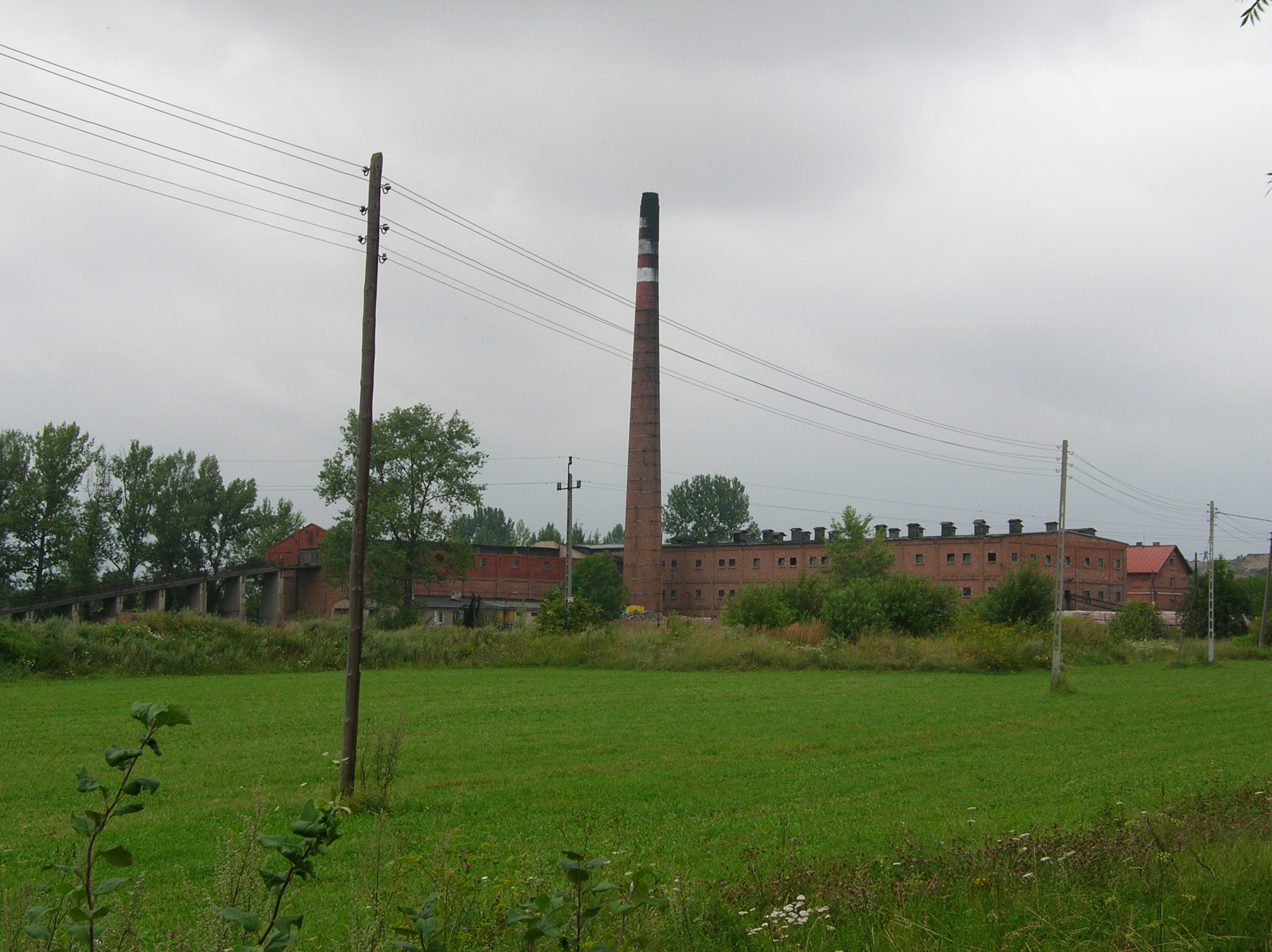
Brickyard at Lisowice (Lipie Śląskie, Upper Silesia) where Upper Triassic tetrapods were found.

Abundant skeletons of the Upper Triassic tetrapods (i.e., Lisowicia, Smok wawelski) were described from the clay pit located between Lisowice and Lipie Śląskie.
