= Skrzydłowice =

- Village
- Location within Poland
- Coordinates: 50°41′N 18°33′E
- Country: Poland
- Voivodeship: Silesian
- County: Lubliniec
- Gmina: Pawonków

Skrzydłowice [skʂɨdwɔˈvit͡sɛ] is a village in the administrative district of Gmina Pawonków, within Lubliniec County, Silesian Voivodeship, in southern Poland.
