= Solarnia, Silesian Voivodeship =

Solarnia
- Village
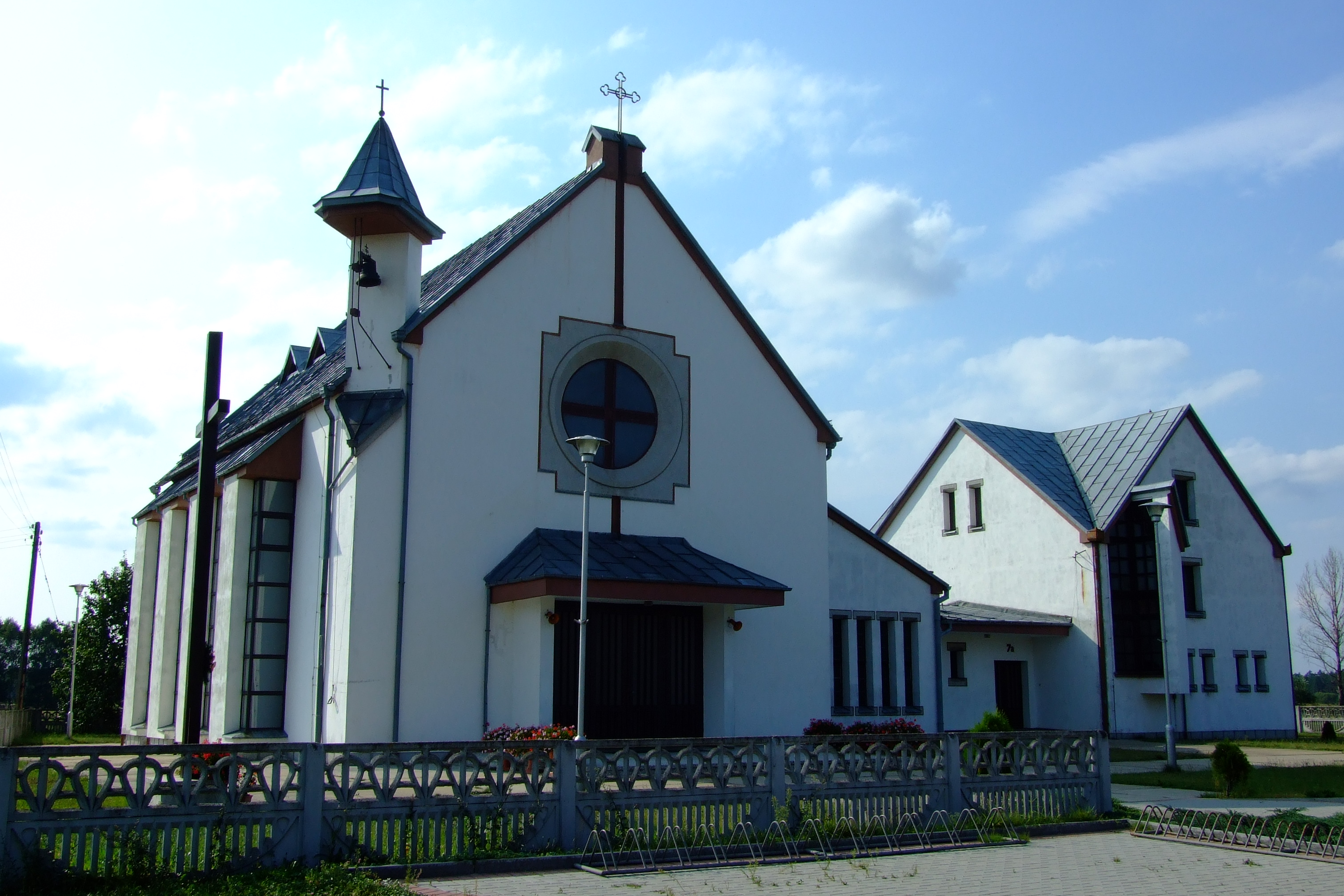
- Catholic church

- Location within Poland
- Coordinates: 50°38′N 18°36′E
- Country: Poland
- Voivodeship: Silesian
- County: Lubliniec
- Gmina: Pawonków

Solarnia [sɔˈlarɲa] is a village in the administrative district of Gmina Pawonków, within Lubliniec County, Silesian Voivodeship, in southern Poland.
