= Koszwice =

- Village
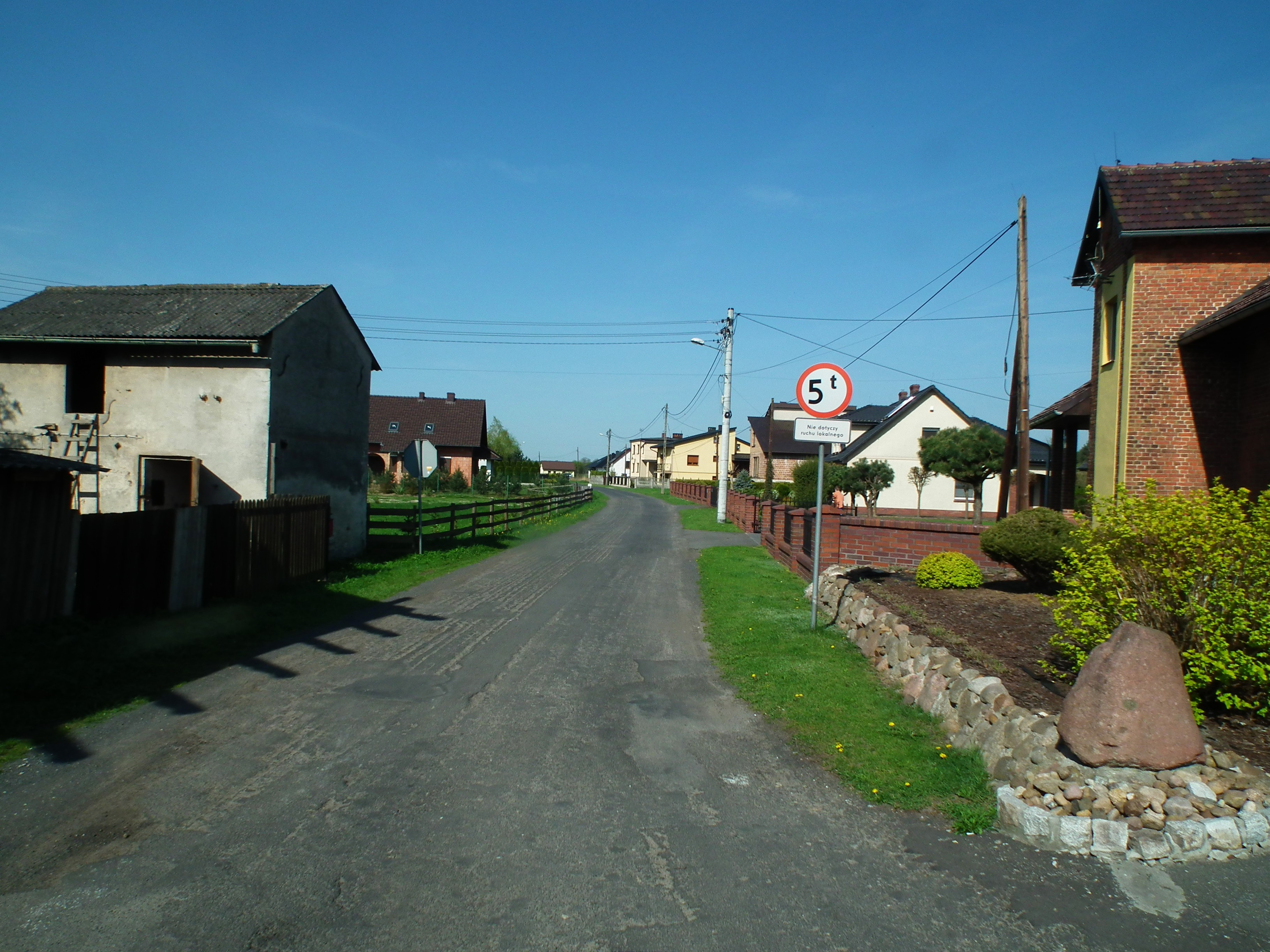

- Location within Poland
- Coordinates: 50°39′N 18°31′E
- Country: Poland
- Voivodeship: Silesian
- County: Lubliniec
- Gmina: Pawonków

Koszwice [kɔʂˈfit͡sɛ] is a village in the administrative district of Gmina Pawonków, within Lubliniec County, Silesian Voivodeship, in southern Poland.
