= Gmina Pawonków =

Gmina Pawonków Pawonków Commune
- Gmina
- Coat of arms
- Interactive map of Gmina Pawonków
- Coordinates (Pawonków): 50°42′N 18°35′E
- Country: Poland
- Voivodeship: Silesian
- County: Lubliniec
- Seat: Pawonków

Area
  - Total: 118.74 km^{2} (45.85 sq mi)

Population (2019-06-30)
  - Total: 6,630
  - Density: 55.8/km^{2} (145/sq mi)
- Website: http://www.pawonkow.pl

Gmina Pawonków is a rural gmina (administrative district) in Lubliniec County, Silesian Voivodeship, in southern Poland. Its seat is the village of Pawonków, which lies approximately 8 kilometres (5 mi) west of Lubliniec and 58 km (36 mi) north-west of the regional capital Katowice.

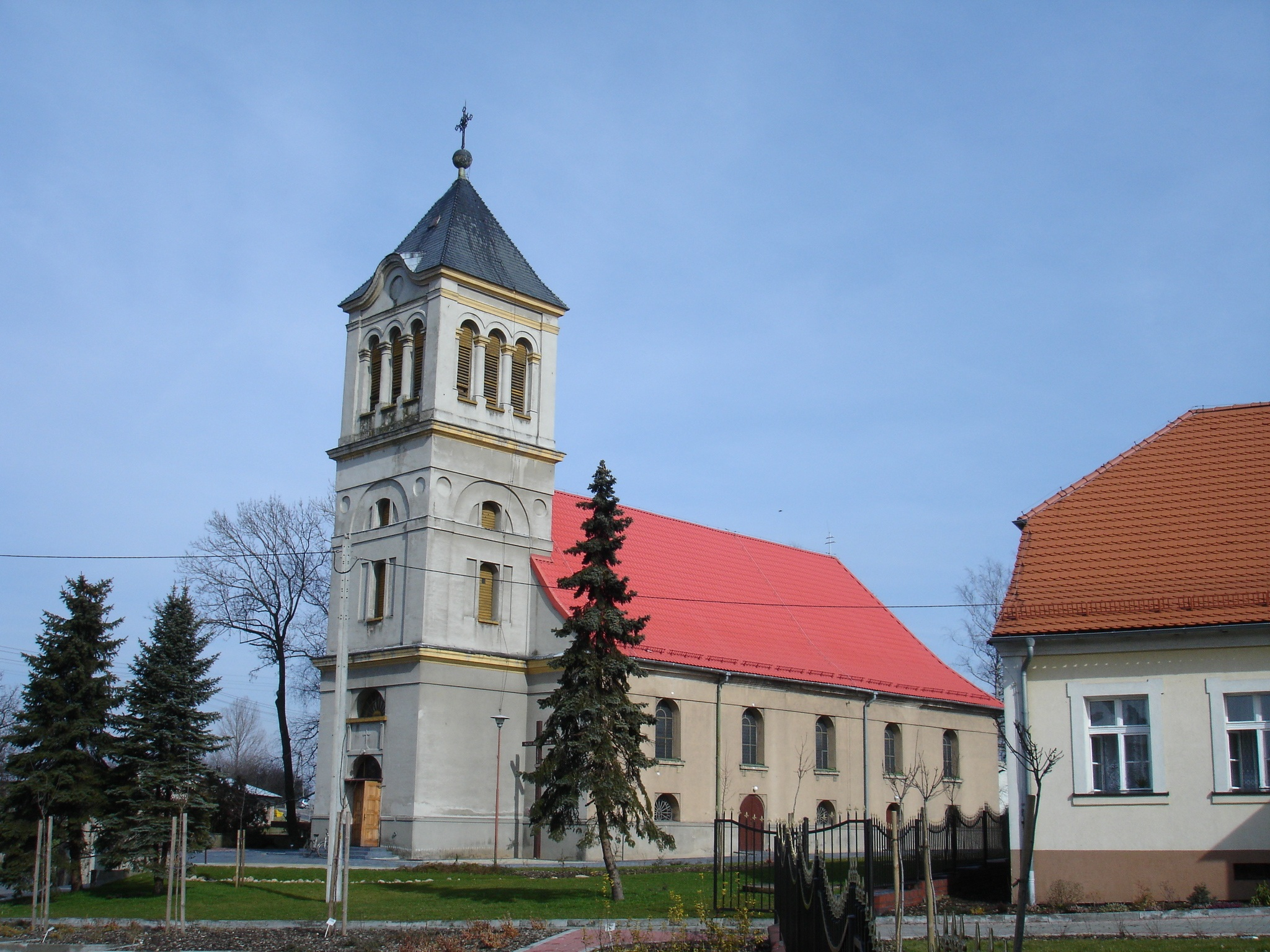

The gmina covers an area of 118.74 square kilometres (45.8 sq mi), and as of 2019 its total population was 6,630.

== Villages ==
Gmina Pawonków contains the villages and settlements of Draliny, Gwoździany, Kośmidry, Koszwice, Łagiewniki Małe, Łagiewniki Wielkie, Lipie Śląskie, Lisowice, Pawonków, Skrzydłowice and Solarnia.

== Neighbouring gminas ==
Gmina Pawonków is bordered by the town of Lubliniec and by the gminas of Ciasna, Dobrodzień, Kochanowice, Krupski Młyn and Zawadzkie.
