= Heinrich Hilgenreiner =

Heinrich Hilgenreiner (3 November 1870 – 24 October 1954) German surgeon and orthopedist.

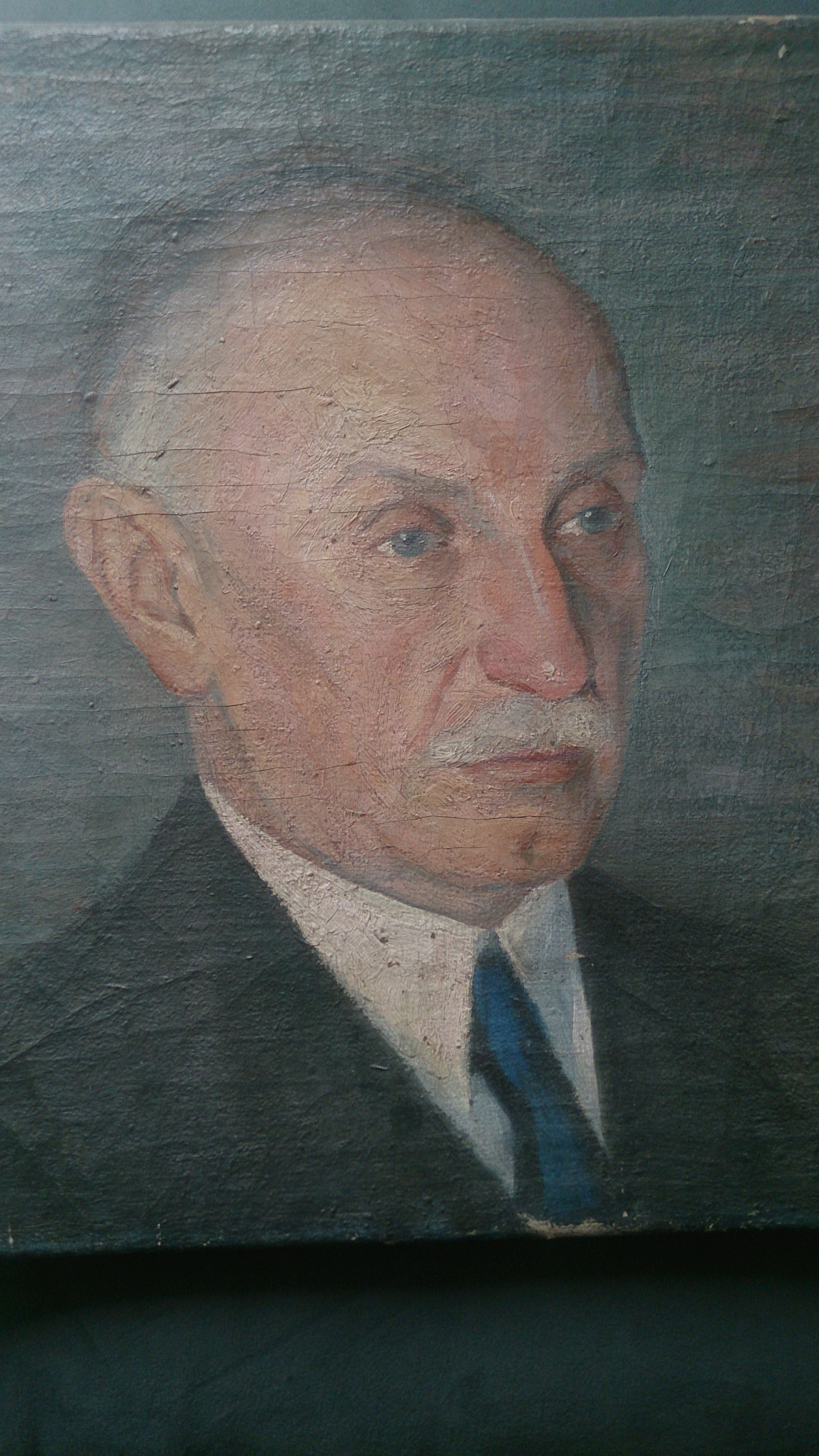
Prof. Dr. med. Heinrich Hilgenreiner

== Biography ==
Born in Prague, and raised in a German family in Bohemia (which at the time was part of the Habsburg monarchy), he served as a medical officer in the First World War. After the war, he became a professor of the German Charles-Ferdinand University in Prague and director of the Kinderklinik (children's clinic). In 1946 he was forced to leave Czechoslovakia for Austria, where he lived until his death. He was the younger brother of Karl Hilgenreiner, a theologian and politician, also professor at Charles University. He is the grandfather of the Austrian artist Gerhard Gleich. He died in 1954 in Spillern, Austria.

== Work ==
As a professor at the Karls-Universität in Prague, he became a specialist on the diagnosis and cure of congenital luxation of the hip joint in infants and young children. "Hilgenreiner's line" (in German: Hilgenreiners Hilfslinien; Hilgenreiners Beckenskiagramm) is a system of lines drawn on an x-ray used for the diagnosis of this condition.

== Literature ==
Heinrich Hilgenreiner (1935) "Die angeborene Dysplasie der Hüfte: 10 Jahre Abduktionsschiene und Frühbehandlung der angeborenen Hüftverrenkung" in: "Zeitschrift für orthopädische Chirurgie einschliesslich Heilgymnastik und Massage", Stuttgart, 63: 344-483.
