= Łagiewniki Wielkie =

- Village
- Location within Poland
- Coordinates: 50°42′N 18°35′E
- Country: Poland
- Voivodeship: Silesian
- County: Lubliniec
- Gmina: Pawonków

Łagiewniki Wielkie [waɡʲɛvˈniki ˈvjɛlkʲɛ] is a village in the administrative district of Gmina Pawonków, within Lubliniec County, Silesian Voivodeship, in southern Poland.
