= Gwoździany =

- Village
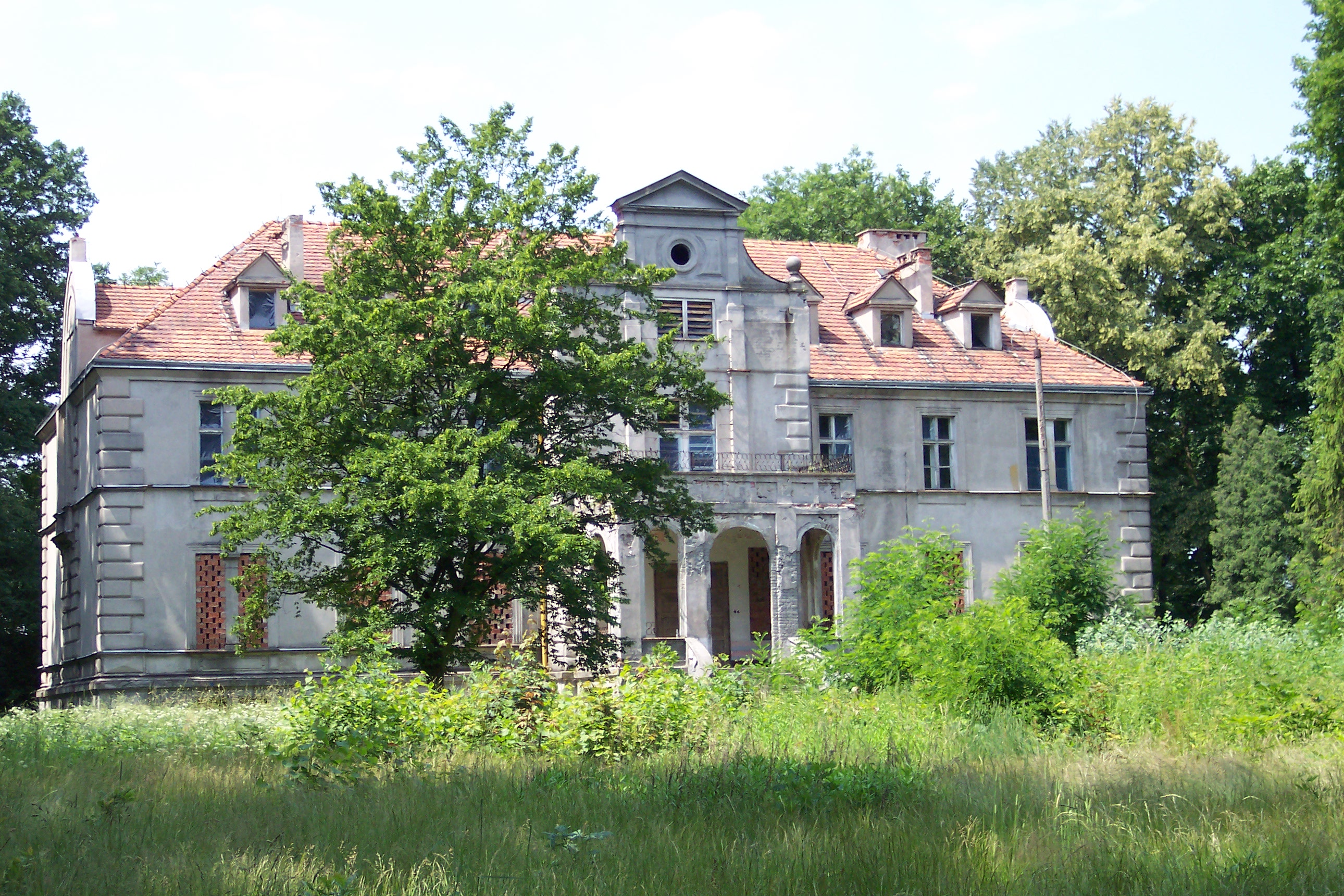
- Palace

- Location within Poland
- Coordinates: 50°43′21″N 18°31′49″E
- Country: Poland
- Voivodeship: Silesian
- County: Lubliniec
- Gmina: Pawonków

Gwoździany [ɡvɔʑˈd͡ʑanɨ] is a village in the administrative district of Gmina Pawonków, within Lubliniec County, Silesian Voivodeship, in southern Poland.
