= Pawonków =

- Village
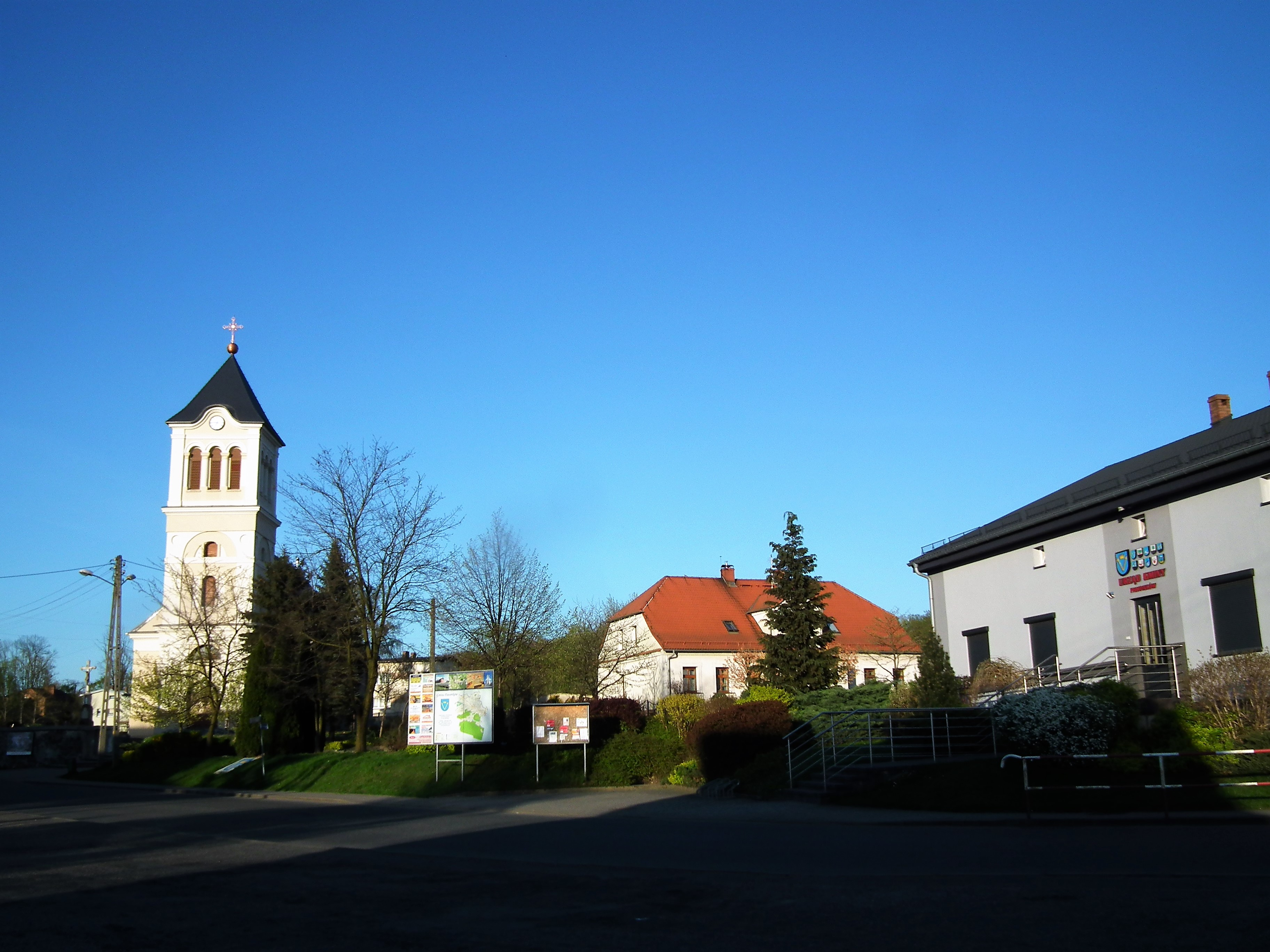
- Center of the village with the church and the municipal office

- Location within Poland
- Coordinates: 50°41′N 18°34′E
- Country: Poland
- Voivodeship: Silesian
- County: Lubliniec
- Gmina: Pawonków

Pawonków [paˈvɔnkuf] (German Pawonkau) is a village in Lubliniec County, Silesian Voivodeship, in southern Poland. It is the seat of the gmina (administrative district) called Gmina Pawonków.
