= Łagiewniki Małe =

- Village
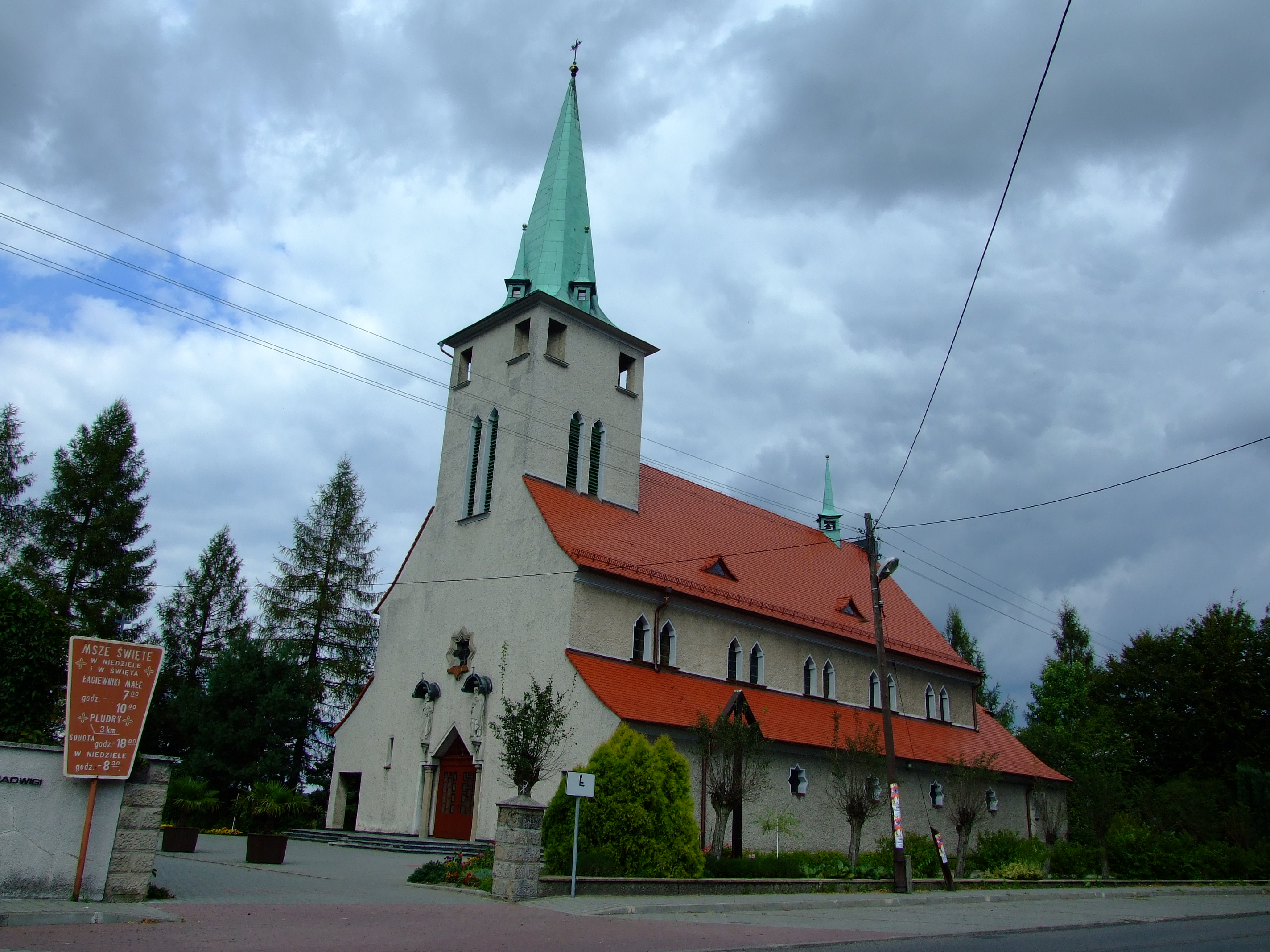
- Catholic church

- Location within Poland
- Coordinates: 50°41′N 18°31′E
- Country: Poland
- Voivodeship: Silesian
- County: Lubliniec
- Gmina: Pawonków
- Website: http://www.lagiewniki-male.pl

Łagiewniki Małe [waɡʲɛvˈniki ˈmawɛ] is a village in the administrative district of Gmina Pawonków, within Lubliniec County, Silesian Voivodeship, in southern Poland.
