= Lipie Śląskie =

- Village
- Location within Poland
- Coordinates: 50°40′20″N 18°38′50″E
- Country: Poland
- Voivodeship: Silesian
- County: Lubliniec
- Gmina: Pawonków

Lipie Śląskie [ˈlipjɛ ˈɕlɔ̃skʲɛ] is a village in the administrative district of Gmina Pawonków, within Lubliniec County, Silesian Voivodeship, in southern Poland.

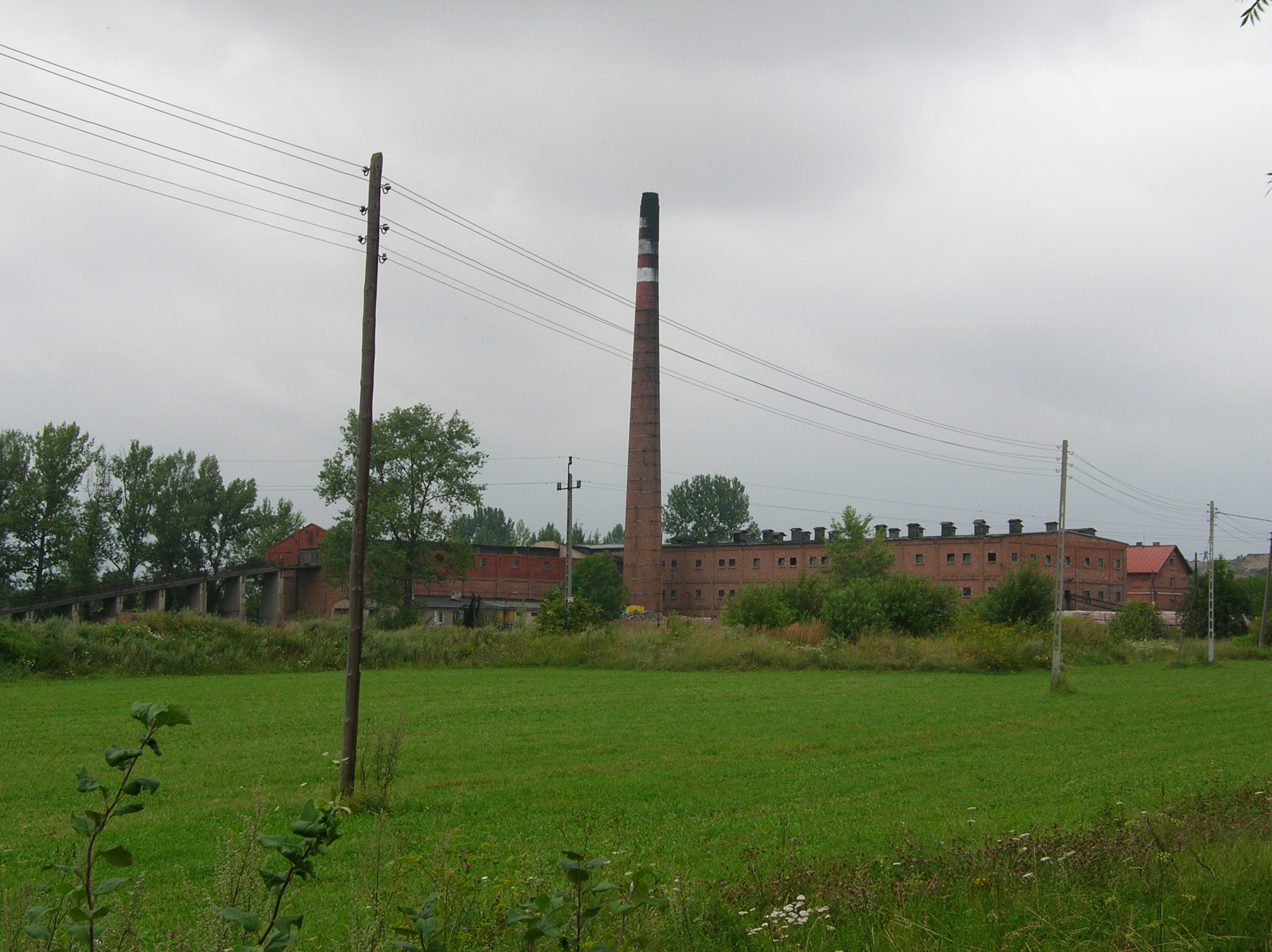
Brickyard at Lisowice (Lipie Śląskie, Upper Silesia) where Upper Triassic tetrapods were found.

Abundant skeletons of the Upper Triassic tetrapods (i.e., large dicynodonts, dinosaurs) were described from the clay pit located between Lisowice and Lipie Śląskie.
