= Acetabulum (cup) =

Roman vinegar vessel

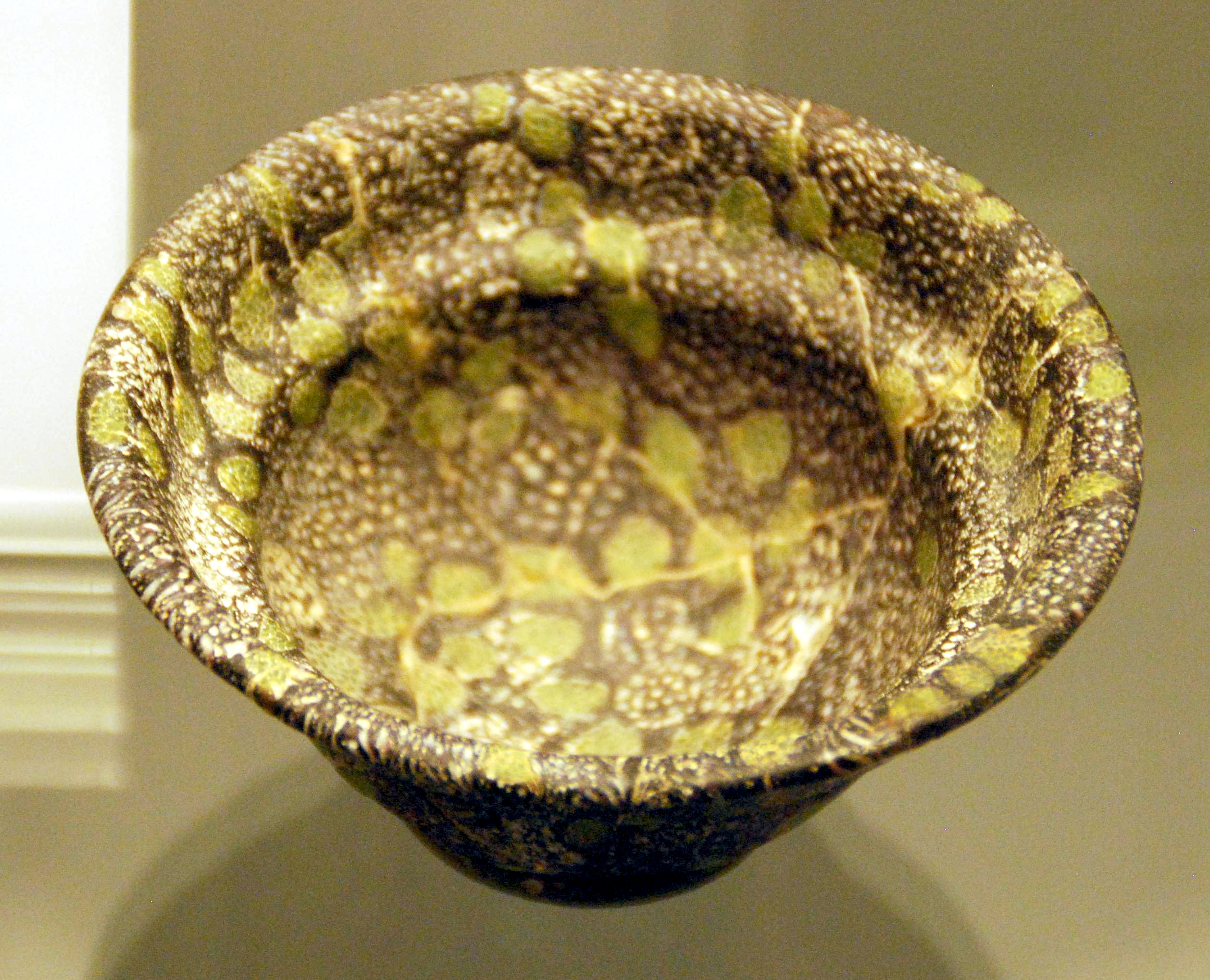
Roman acetabulum in purple opaque glass with colorful ornaments, made during the 1st century. Museum August Kestner

In ancient dining, an acetabulum (Greek: ὀξίς, ὀξύβαφον, ὀξυβάφιον) was a vinegar-cup, which, from the fondness of the Greeks and Romans for vinegar, was placed on the table at meals to dip food before eating. The vessel was wide and open above; and the name was also given to all cups resembling it in size and form, to whatever use they might be applied. The cups used by jugglers in their performances were also called by this name. They were commonly of earthenware, but sometimes of glass, silver, bronze, or gold. On account of its shape, Roman anatomists gave the name acetabulum to the place where the pelvis that meets the head of the femur, forming the hip joint.

== Etymology ==
Acetabulum literally means "a small saucer for vinegar". It is derived from the Latin word acetum, meaning "vinegar", and -bulum, an instrumental suffix.
