= Triradiate cartilage =

Part of human anatomy

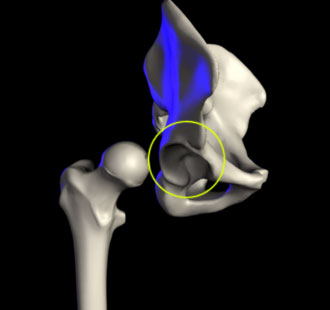
- The acetabulum
- TA2: 1859

The triradiate cartilage (in Latin cartilago ypsiloformis) is the Y-shaped epiphyseal plate between the ilium, ischium and pubis to form the acetabulum of the os coxae.

== Human development ==
In children, the triradiate cartilage closes at an approximate bone age of 12 years for girls and 14 years for boys.

== Clinical use ==
Evaluating the position of the triradiate cartilage on an AP radiograph of the pelvis with both Perkin's line and Hilgenreiner's line can help establish a diagnosis of developmental dysplasia of the hip.
