= Acetabulum =

Cavity where the thigh bone (femur) articulates with the pelvis

Acetabulum of pelvis
- Pelvic girdle

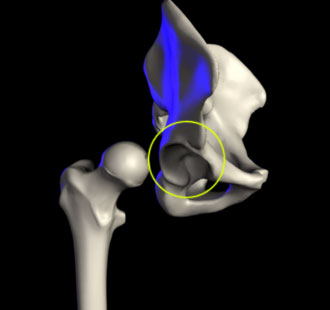
- A model of the acetabulum (cotyloid cavity)

Details

Identifiers
- Latin: acetabulum
- MeSH: D000077
- TA98: A02.5.01.002
- TA2: 1308
- FMA: 16579

The acetabulum (/ˌæsɪˈtæbjələm/; pl.: acetabula), also called the cotyloid cavity, is a concave surface of the pelvis. The head of the femur meets with the pelvis at the acetabulum, forming the hip joint.

== Structure ==
There are three bones of the os coxae (hip bone) that come together to form the acetabulum. Contributing a little more than two-fifths of the structure is the ischium, which provides lower and side boundaries to the acetabulum. The ilium forms the upper boundary, providing a little less than two-fifths of the structure of the acetabulum. The rest is formed by the pubis, near the midline.

It is bounded by a prominent uneven rim, thick and strong on top, which serves as the point of attachment for the acetabular labrum. The acetabular labrum reduces the size of the opening of the acetabulum and deepens the surface of the hip joint. At the lower part of the acetabulum is the acetabular notch, which is continuous with a circular depression, the acetabular fossa, at the bottom of the cavity of the acetabulum. The rest of the acetabulum is formed by a curved, crescent-moon shaped surface, the lunate surface, where the joint is made with the head of the femur. Its counterpart in the pectoral girdle is the glenoid fossa.

The acetabulum is also home to the acetabular fossa, an attachment site for the ligamentum teres, a triangular, somewhat flattened band implanted by its apex into the antero-superior part of the fovea capitis femoris. The notch is converted into a foramen by the transverse acetabular ligament; through the foramen nutrient vessels and nerves enter the joint. This is what holds the head of the femur securely in the acetabulum.

The well-fitting surfaces of the femoral head and acetabulum, which face each other, are lined with a layer of slippery tissue called articular cartilage, which is lubricated by a thin film of synovial fluid. Friction inside a normal hip is less than one-tenth that of ice gliding on ice.

=== Blood supply ===
The acetabular branch of the obturator artery supplies the acetabulum through the acetabular notch. The pubic branches supply the pelvic surface of the acetabulum. Deep branches of the superior gluteal artery supply the superior region and the inferior gluteal artery supplies the postero-inferior region.

=== Reptiles and birds ===
An example of a perforated acetabulum on an ornithischian dinosaur

In reptiles and birds, the acetabula are deep sockets. Organisms in the dinosauria clade are defined by a perforate acetabulum, which can be thought of as a "hip-socket". The perforate acetabulum is a cup-shaped opening on each side of the pelvic girdle formed where the ischium, ilium, and pubis all meet, and into which the head of the femur inserts. The orientation and position of the acetabulum is one of the main morphological traits that caused dinosaurs to walk in an upright posture with their legs directly underneath their bodies. In a relatively small number of dinosaurs, particularly ankylosaurians (e.g. Texasetes pleurohalio), an imperforate acetabulum is present, which is not an opening, but instead resembles a shallow concave depression on each side of the pelvic girdle.

== Development ==
In infants and children, a Y-shaped epiphyseal plate called the triradiate cartilage joins the ilium, ischium, and pubis. This cartilage ossifies as the child grows.

== History ==
The word acetabulum literally means "little vinegar cup". It was the Latin word for a small vessel for serving vinegar. The word was later also used as a unit of volume.

== Additional images ==
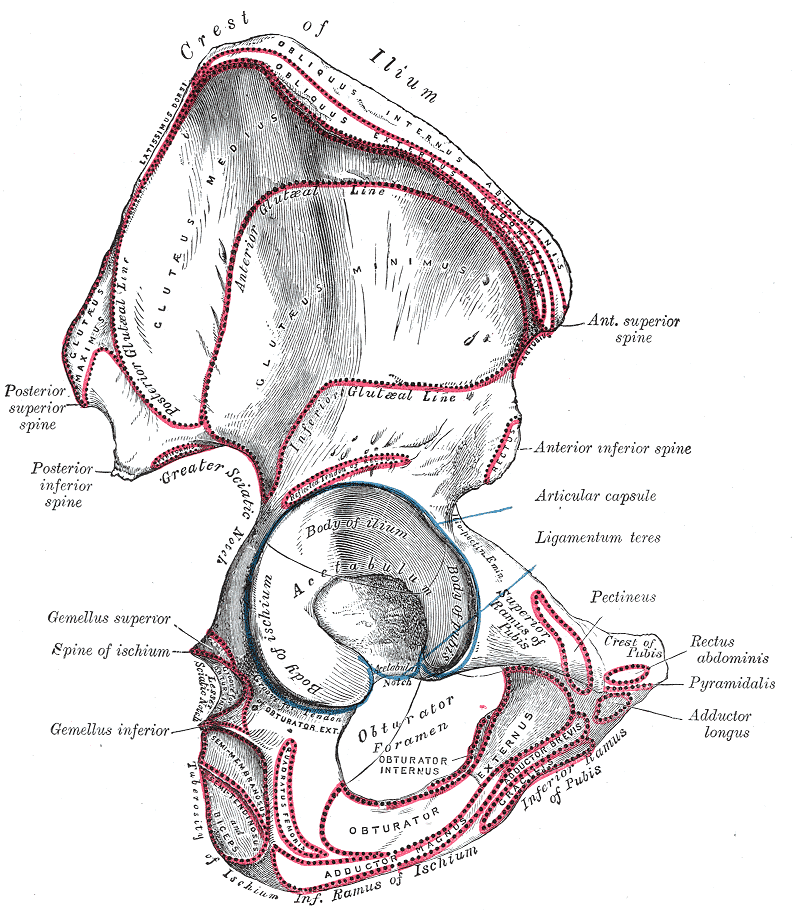
Right hip bone. External surface.

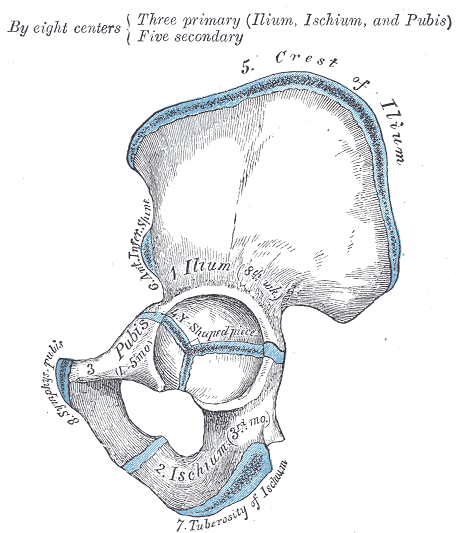
Plan of ossification of the hip bone

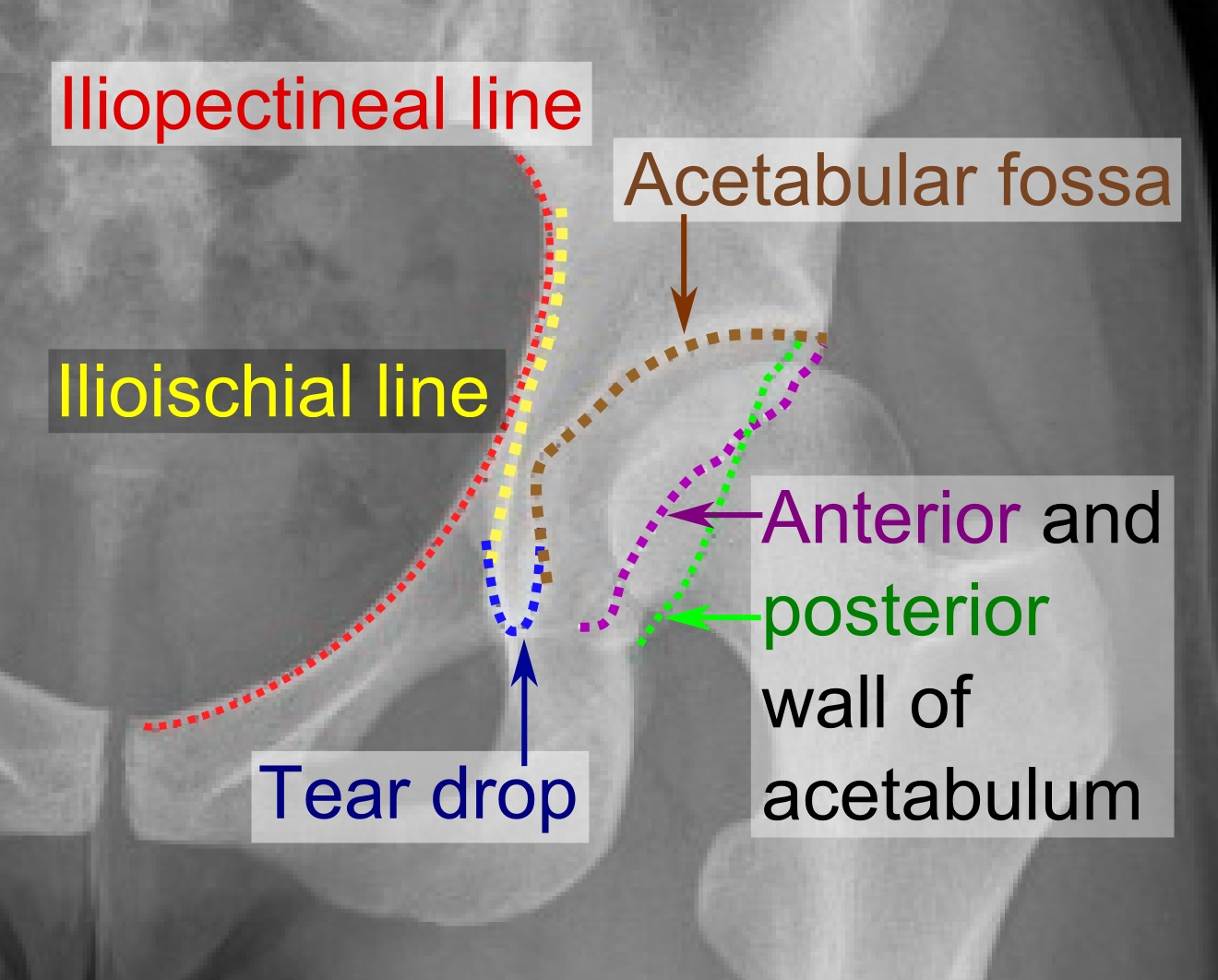
X-ray of the acetabulum, with measurements used in X-ray of hip dysplasia in adults

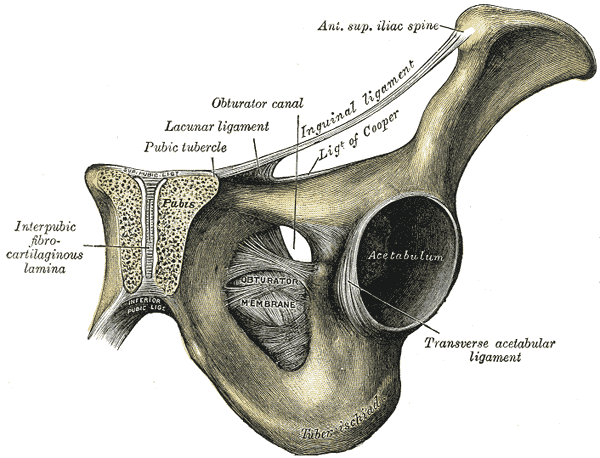
Symphysis pubis exposed by a coronal section

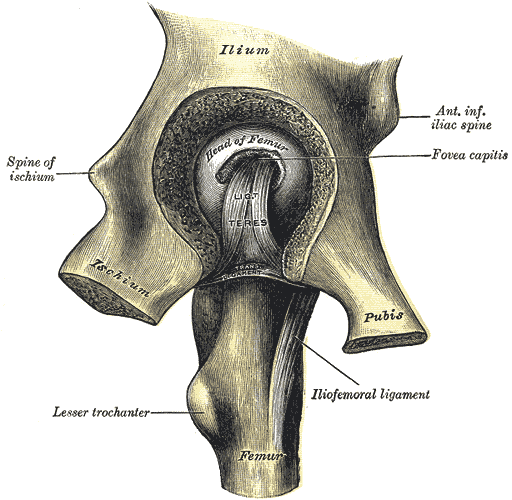
Left hip-joint, opened by removing the floor of the acetabulum from within the pelvis

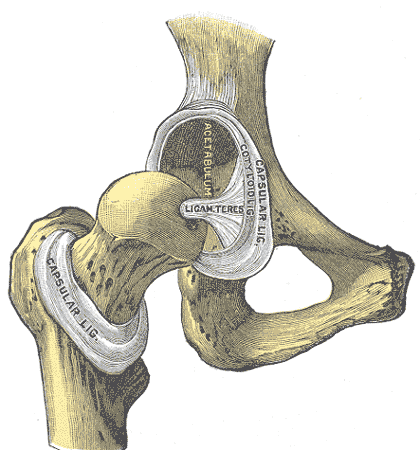
Hip-joint, front view

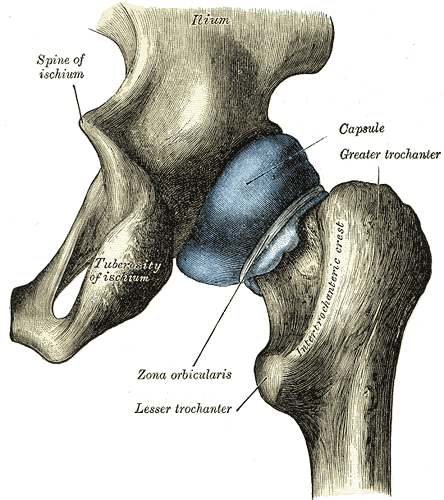
Capsule of hip-joint (distended). Posterior aspect.

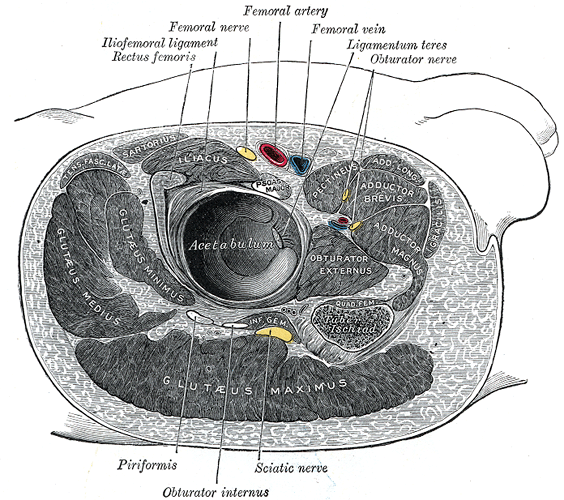
Structures surrounding right hip-joint

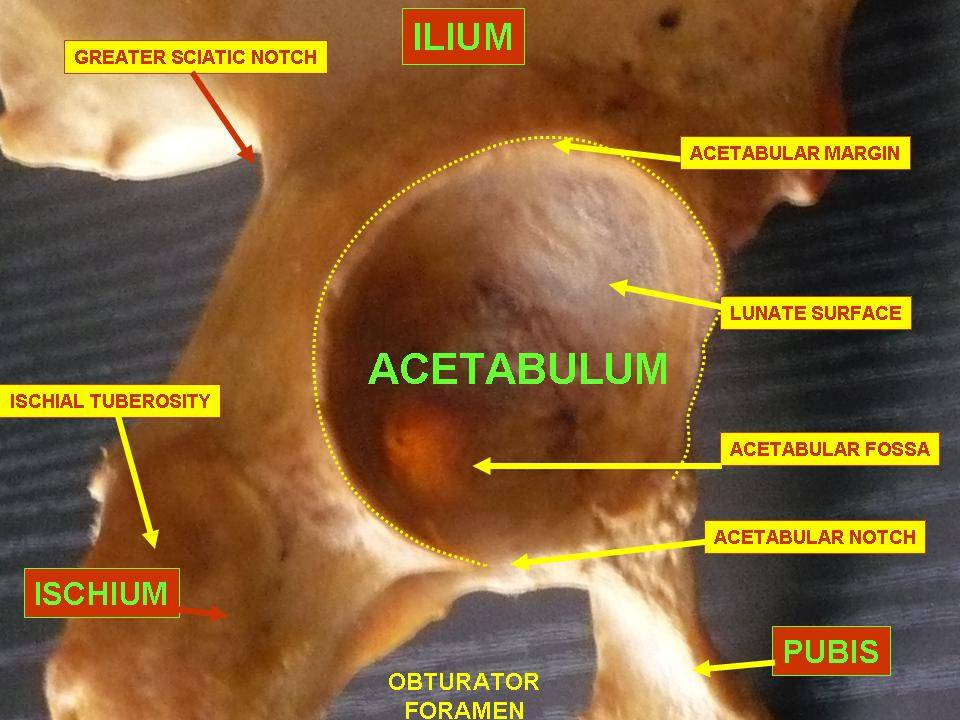
Acetabulum

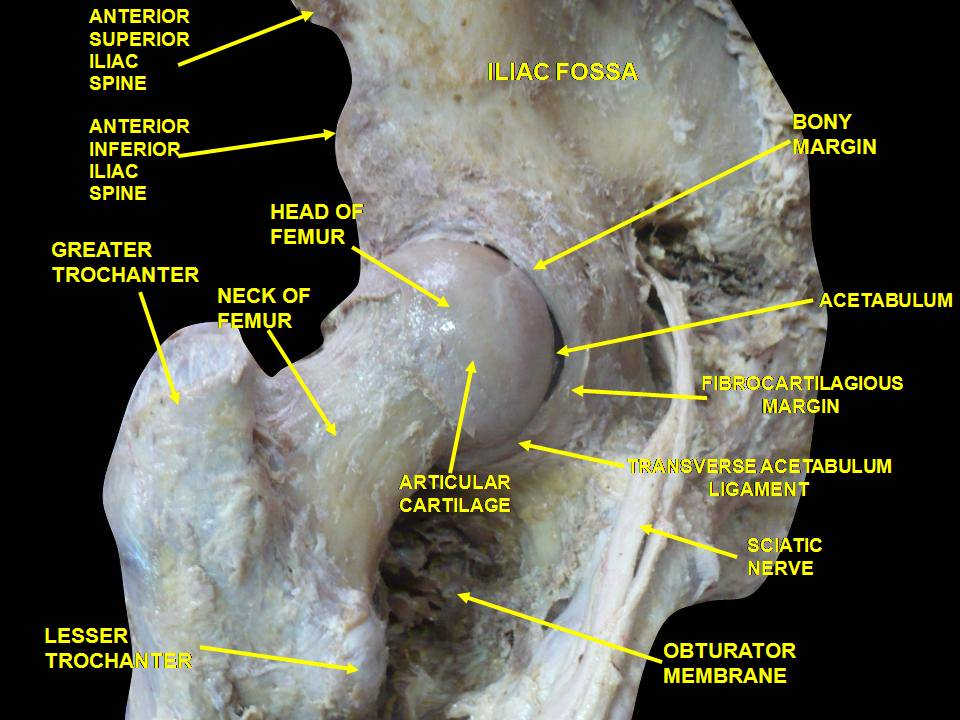
Hip joint. Lateral view. Acetabulum.

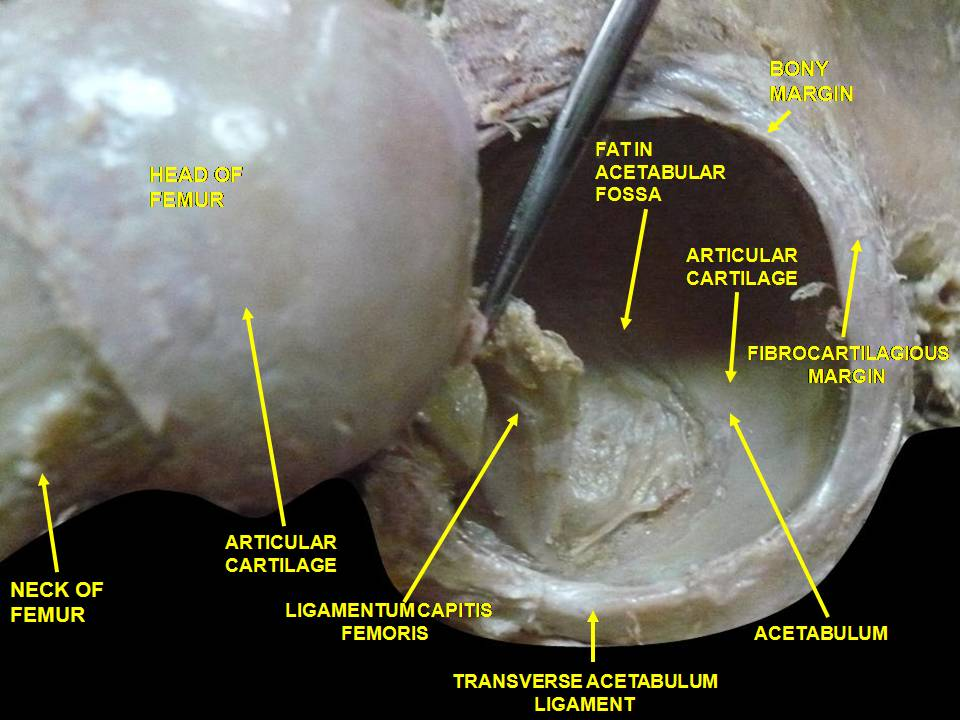
Hip joint. Lateral view. Acetabulum.

== See also ==
- Acetabulum (morphology)
- Acetabulum (cup)
