= Acetabulum (unit) =

Volume unit in Ancient Roman measurement

In Ancient Roman measurement, the acetabulum was a measure of volume (fluid and dry) equivalent to the Greek ὀξύβαφον, oxybaphon. It was one-fourth of the hemina and therefore one-eighth of the sextarius. It contained the weight in water of fifteen Attic drachmae.

Used with some frequency by Pliny the Elder, in a 1952 translation the unit was judged to be equivalent to 63 ml (2.2 imp fl oz; 2.1 US fl oz). However, other sources estimate a higher value of perhaps 68 ml (2.4 imp fl oz; 2.3 US fl oz) (see Ancient Roman units of measurement).
