= Hip arthroscopy =

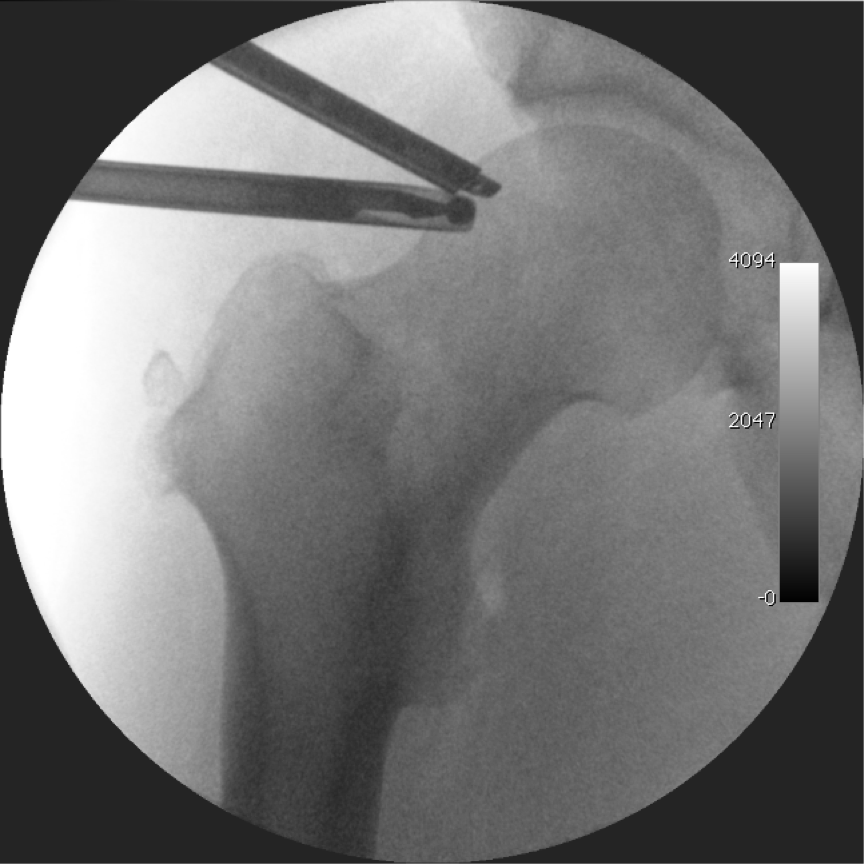
- Intraoperative fluoroscopic image during an arthroscopic resection of a cam lesion of the femur. The upper instrument is the arthroscope (viewing device), while the lower is the high-speed burr used for reshaping the bone.

Hip arthroscopy refers to the viewing of the interior of the acetabulofemoral (hip) joint through an arthroscope and the treatment of hip pathology through a minimally invasive approach. This technique is sometimes used to help in the treatment of various joint disorders and has gained popularity because of the small incisions used and shorter recovery times when compared with conventional surgical techniques (sometimes referred to as "open surgery"). Hip arthroscopy was not feasible until recently, new technology in both the tools used and the ability to distract the hip joint has led to a recent surge in the ability to do hip arthroscopy and the popularity of it.

== History ==
The first man to describe the use of an arthroscope to see inside a joint was Severin Nordentoft, from Denmark, in 1912. Since that time, the field of arthroscopy has evolved to encompass diagnostic and therapeutic procedures to many joints. Technical advances in instrument manufacture and optical technologies have, in part, made it possible for the surgeon to gain access to reliable views of increasingly smaller joint spaces. Now, there is an International Society for Hip Arthroscopy (ISHA), comprising some of the leading hip arthroscopy specialists in the world.

Arthroscopic techniques have become an increasingly popular method of treating hip conditions. Although first described in the 1970s, since approximately 2000 the indications and numbers of hip arthroscopic procedures performed worldwide have expanded widely. This is due mainly to the identification of pathological conditions such as femoroacetabular impingement (FAI) and tears of the acetabular labrum.

The concept of FAI was first described by Smith-Petersen. However, modern diagnosis and treatment of FAI was pioneered by Ganz in 2003, who initially advocated the use of an open surgical dislocation technique for treatment of intra-articular pathology. This involved the use of the 'trochanteric flip' approach to gain access to the hip joint. This is an extensive approach, needing an often large incision over the side of the hip, with the detachment of the greater trochanter of the femur and its attached musculature to gain access to the joint. By using this approach, the ball of the hip joint can be rotated out of the socket (termed 'surgical dislocation'), giving 360-degree access to the whole joint. This approach, although considered generally safe, carries with it inherent risks, which is the case with all large incision surgery. The risks of infection and blood clots are always present, and Ganz and his colleagues cite complications such as heterotopic ossification (new bone formation around the hip), nerve injuries, failure of the greater trochanter to heal back properly, persistent pain following the formation of scar tissue (adhesions) in the hip joint, and a small risk of damage of the blood supply to the femoral head. The patient usually needs to stay in hospital for a few days, and the post-operative rehabilitation after such extensive surgery can be prolonged. As a result, surgeons have looked to use the arthroscope more extensively in the hip joint in an attempt to avoid the possible pitfalls of large, open surgery. The perceived advantages of this are the avoidance of large scars, decreased blood loss, faster recovery periods and less pain. Hip arthroscopy can be performed as an outpatient procedure (i.e. no need to stay in hospital overnight).

== Indications ==
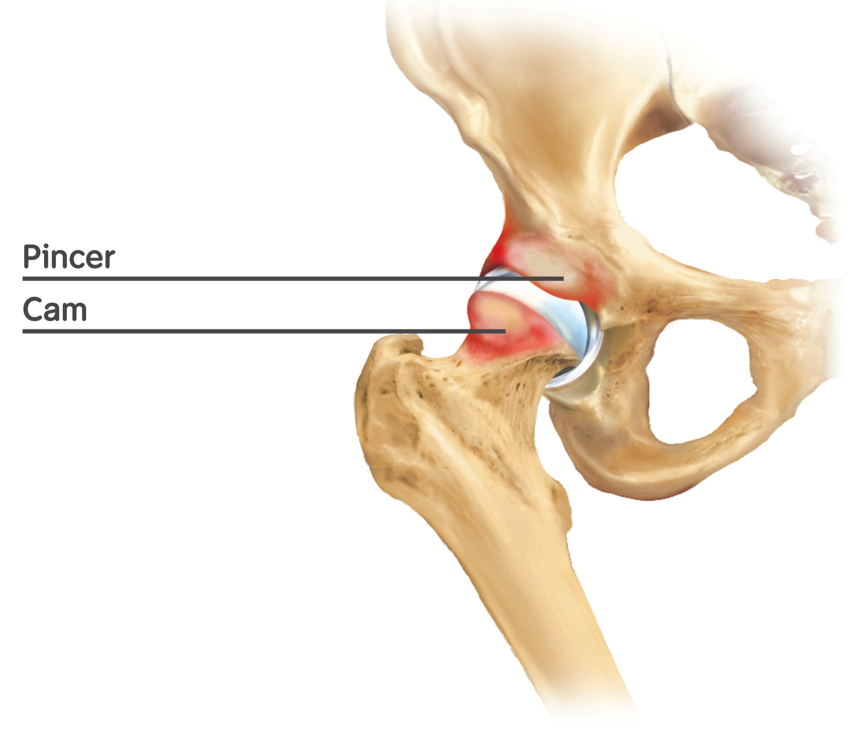
Figure 6. Diagram of the bony pathology of both cam and pincer impingement

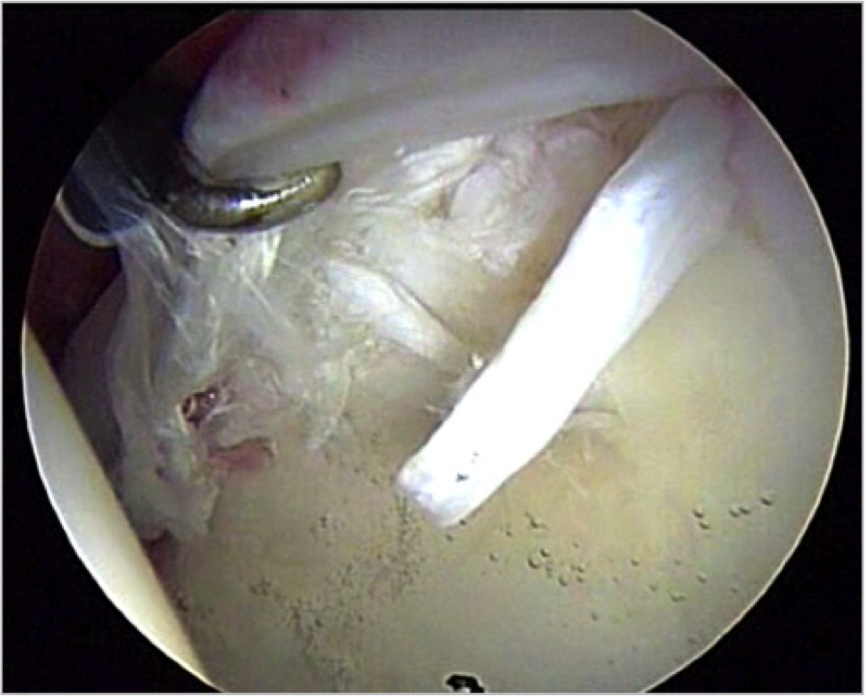
Figure 7. A complex labral tear. An arthroscopic probe is seen at the junction of the labrum and acetabular rim

Hip arthroscopy was initially used for the diagnosis of unexplained hip pain, but is now widely used in the treatment of conditions both in and outside the hip joint itself. The most common indication is for the treatment of FAI (femoral acetabular impingement) and its associated pathologies such as labral tears and cartilage abnormalities, among others (see Table 1).

Table 1. A selection of hip conditions that may be treated arthroscopically.

Femoroacetabular impingement (see fig. 6)
Labral tears (see fig. 7)
Loose / foreign body removal
Hip washout (for infection) or biopsy
Chondral (cartilage) lesions (see fig. 8)
Osteochondritis dissecans
Ligamentum teres injuries (and reconstruction)
Iliopsoas tendinopathy (or 'snapping psoas')
Trochanteric pain syndrome
Snapping iliotibial band
Osteoarthritis (controversial)
Sciatic nerve compression (piriformis syndrome)
Ischiofemoral impingement
Direct assessment of hip replacement

== Technique ==
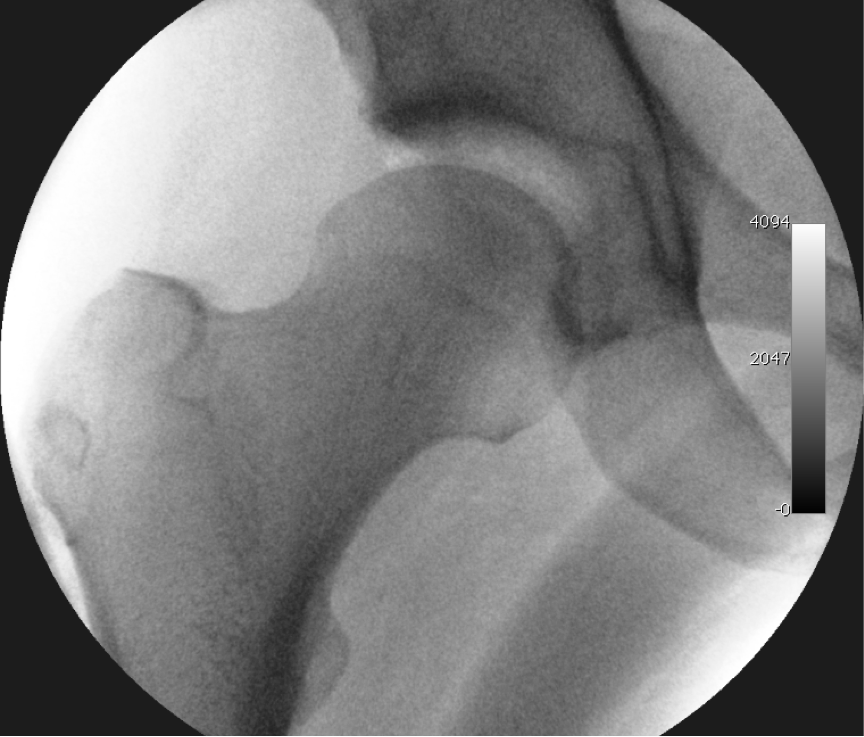
Figure 3. Fluoroscopic picture showing a mild amount of distraction of the hip before insertion of any instruments

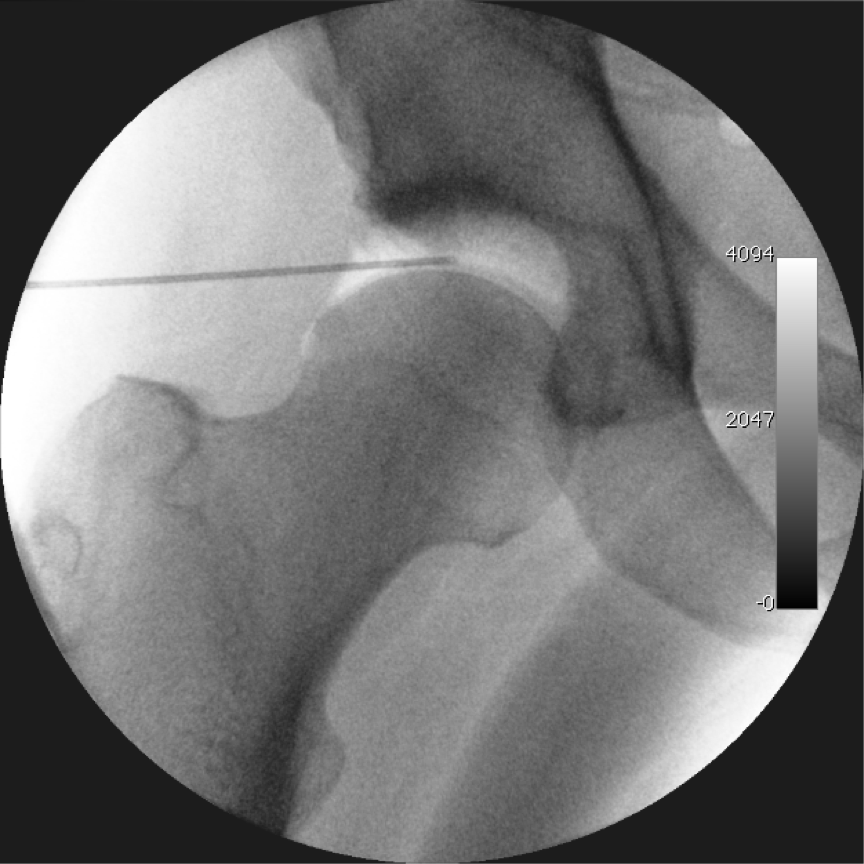
Figure 4. A needle is passed into the joint, breaking the 'suction seal', and allowing further distraction of the hip joint with minimal extra traction

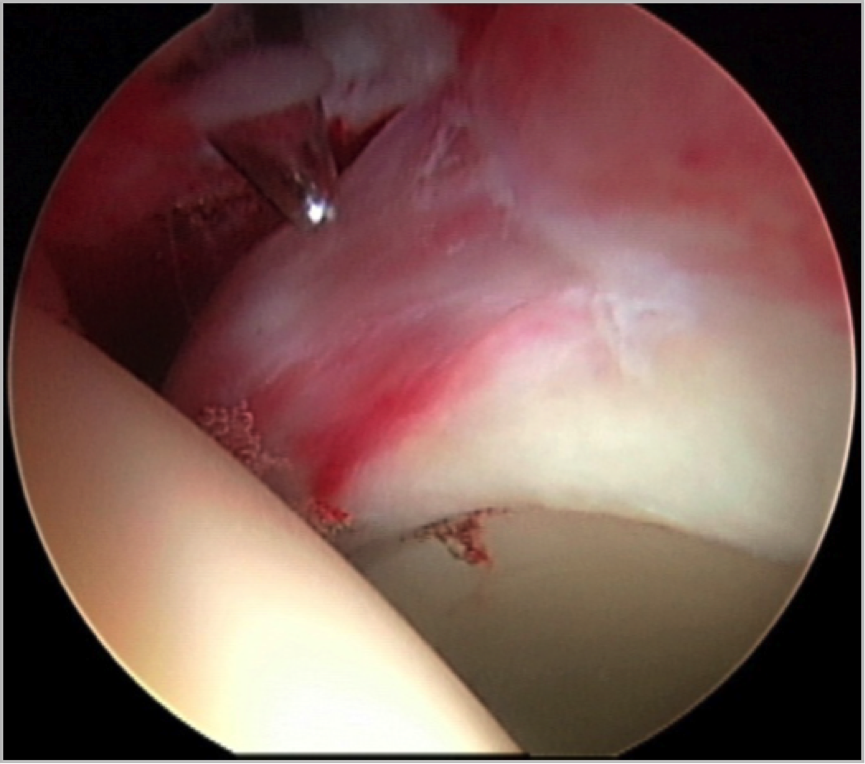
Figure 5. Portal placement under direct vision. The instrument is entering the joint through the hip capsule, between the femoral head (on the left) and acetabular labrum (on the right)

The procedure is performed with the patient asleep (general anaesthetic) or under spinal anaesthesia. There are two widely used methods, one with the patient on their back (supine) and the other on their side (lateral decubitus). Which is used is down to the surgeon's preference. To gain access to the central compartment of the hip joint (between the ball and socket), traction is applied to the affected leg after placing the foot into a special boot. (See fig. 2) There is specifically designed equipment for this, although some surgeons use a 'traction table', initially designed to help in the operative fixation of broken thigh and lower leg bones. The amount of traction (or pull) needed is assessed with the help of fluoroscopy (low-dose portable x-ray). (See fig. 3) It is usually not possible to distract the ball from the socket with traction alone by more than a few millimetres. Once the surgeon is happy that they will be able to gain access to the hip joint (i.e. the ball will distract from the socket by a small amount), the patient is then painted with antiseptic and the surgical drapes applied.

The next step is to insert a fine needle under x-ray guidance into the hip joint. This breaks the 'suction seal' of the joint and allows further distraction if necessary (see fig 4). The surgeon wishes to see the ball move out the socket by approximately 1 cm, so that access to the hip joint can be achieved with minimal risk of damage to the joint surfaces. Most surgeons will inject fluid into the joint at this stage, again to ensure that there is enough space between the ball and socket for safe instrument access. This needle is then removed. The next step is placement of the 'portals', or the small holes made to pass instruments into the joint. This is achieved by again passing a fresh hollow needle into the joint under x-ray control, usually in a slightly different position. The reason for this is so the surgeon can ensure that the needle, and subsequent cannulae do not penetrate and damage the acetabular labrum or cartilage joint surfaces (see fig. 5). Again, surgeons will have their own preferences as to their preferred placement. Through this hollow needle, a long thin flexible guide wire is passed into the joint, and the needle is removed over it, leaving the guide wire in situ. A small cut in the skin is made around the wire, to allow for larger cannulae to be placed over the wire through the portal. The wire therefore guides the larger cannulae into the joint. The most common external diameters of cannulae used are between 4.5 and 5.5 mm. Once the surgeon is satisfied that the cannula is in the correct position, by a combination of feel and x-ray guidance, the guide wire can be withdrawn. Once the first portal is correctly placed, any further portals may be created once the camera is in position, to ensure that they are placed with minimal risk to the joint surfaces. This process can be repeated to gain as many points of entry to the hip joint as the surgeon requires, normally between two and four. Certain of these entry points will be used for the viewing arthroscope and others for operating instruments.

The operation then begins, a variety of instruments being used. While the surgeon views the interior of the hip joint through the arthroscope, other operating instruments are introduced through the other portals. Once the surgeon has completed the procedure needed between the ball and socket, often referred to as the 'central compartment' of the hip, traction is released, allowing the ball of the hip to sit back snugly into its socket. The arthroscope is then moved to the 'peripheral compartment' an area still inside the hip joint itself but outside its ball and socket portion.

Commonly used arthroscopic tools are the hook probe, used to assess the integrity and consistency of the hip, radiofrequency probes that ablate soft tissue and can also smoothen tissue surfaces, and various shavers or burrs that can take away diseased tissue. If the acetabular labrum requires repair, specially designed anchors may be used. This is by no means a comprehensive list as new instruments are being developed constantly.

=== Cam-type femoroacetabular impingement ===
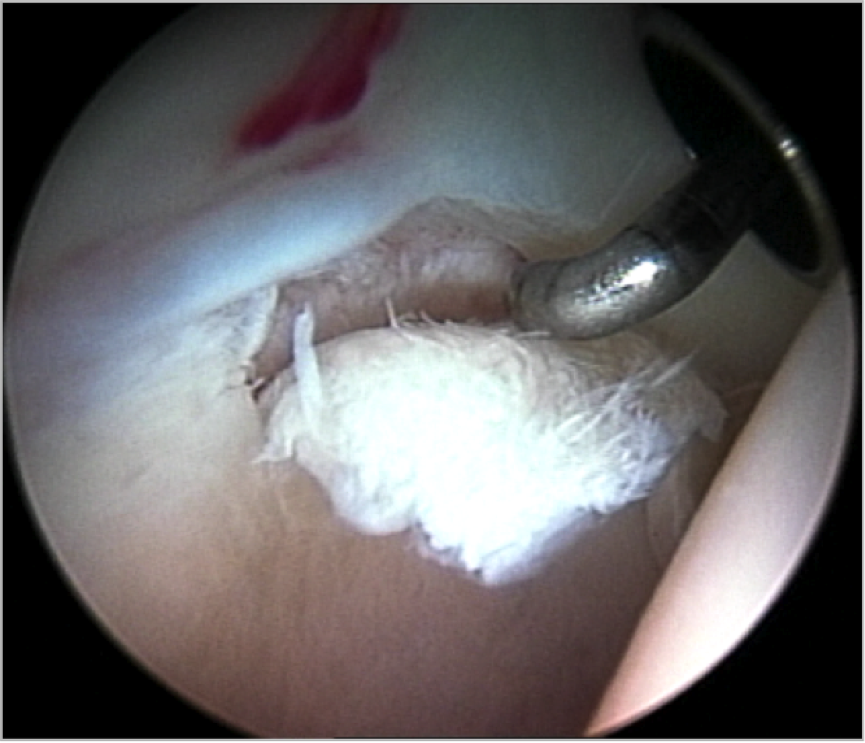
Figure 8. Cartilage delamination. A small area of acetabular cartilage has lifted from the underlying bone, being demonstrated by use of the arthroscopic probe

Cam impingement is created by the abnormal development of the femoral head-neck junction causing what has previously been described as a 'pistol-grip deformity'. This type of deformity is characterised by varying amounts of abnormal bone on the anterior and superior femoral neck at the head-neck junction (see fig. 6). The head-neck junction is at the base of the ball of the hip, where it joins the short neck, which in turn carries on downwards into the femur, or thighbone, itself. A bony protrusion or bump at the head-neck junction has been likened to a cam, an eccentric part of a rotating device. This leads to joint damage as a result of the non-spherical femoral head being forced into the acetabulum mainly with flexion and/or internal rotation. This may impart compression and shear forces to the articular cartilage, and may lead to labral tears and peeling away of the articular cartilage from the underlying bone, so-called cartilage delamination.

Standard arthroscopic treatment of symptomatic cam FAI involves debridement (resection) or repair of any labral and chondral injuries in the central compartment of the hip, and subsequent reshaping of the head-neck junction of the upper femur (osteochondroplasty) in the peripheral compartment using high-speed motorized burrs.

=== Pincer-type femoroacetabular impingement ===
In contrast, pincer impingement is a result of an abnormality on the acetabular side of the hip joint. The acetabulum may either have a more posterior orientation than normal, otherwise known as acetabular retroversion (seen as the crossover sign on AP radiographs), or there may be extra bone around the rim. This results in contact of the femoral neck against the labrum and rim of the acetabulum during hip movement earlier than might otherwise be the case. Repeated contact between the femoral neck and the edge of the acetabulum may lead to damage to the labrum and adjacent articular cartilage. Bone formation, or ossification within the labrum may be commonly seen as a result of this repeated contact. It is thought that this type of impingement may also predispose to the development of osteoarthritis.

The goal of the arthroscopic treatment of pincer impingement is to reduce the acetabular over coverage of the hip. Methods to reduce this over coverage of the ball by the socket include labral detachment or peel back, acetabular rim trimming using burrs, often reattaching the labrum with anchors at the end of the procedure. With the exception of cases of severe global over coverage of the hip, or situations in which the existing labrum has turned to bone (or ossified), excessive acetabular rim resection should be avoided in order to prevent iatrogenic increases in hip joint contact pressures.

=== Labral tears ===
The acetabular labrum is a fibrous structure, which surrounds the femoral head. It forms a seal to the hip joint, although its true function is poorly understood. Recent evidence has demonstrated that this hydraulic seal is vital for maintaining stability of the ball and socket joint and reducing contact pressures of the femur to the acetabulum. The labrum has also been shown to have a nerve supply and as such may cause pain if damaged. The underside of the labrum is continuous with the acetabular articular cartilage so any compressive forces that affect the labrum may also cause articular cartilage damage, particularly at the junction between the two, the chondrolabral junction. The labrum may be damaged or torn as part of an underlying process, such as FAI or dysplasia (shallow hip socket), or may be injured directly by a traumatic event. Depending on the type of tear, the labrum may be either trimmed (debrided) or repaired. Removing or debriding the labrum is becoming less popular as the latest research shows that results are more predictable in the long term if the labrum can be repaired. Various techniques are available for labral repair, mainly using anchors, which may be used to re-stabilise the labrum against the underlying bone, allowing it to heal in position.

New techniques are prevalent in hip arthroscopy. There is good evidence to support the creation of a new labrum by performing a labral reconstruction if the patient has previously had a labral debridement, has an ossified labrum, or the current labrum is too small or injured for a repair. Labral reconstruction involves creating a new labrum either from the patients own tissue (autograft) or from cadaver tissue (allograft). The new labrum is then anchored into position with bone anchors and the hip then goes through extensive rehab.

=== Extra-articular syndromes ===
The hip arthroscope may also be used to treat other conditions, which are outside the hip joint capsule. These include greater trochanteric pain syndrome (GTPS), snapping iliotibial band, piriformis syndrome, deep gluteal syndrome and ischiofemoral impingement. Although the majority of these are newly described techniques, the results appear favorable.

== Complications ==
Hip arthroscopy is generally a very safe technique. However, as with all surgical procedures, there are possible pitfalls and complications. These can be divided into general complications of an operation and those specific to hip arthroscopy itself.

=== Anaesthetic complications ===
Anaesthetic complications are fortunately rare, but include post-operative chest infection, urinary retention (inability to pass urine), gastrointestinal problems (constipation, nausea), heart complications (such as an abnormal rhythm), and even death.

=== Operative complications ===
Despite being uncommon, less than 1%, the risk of infection after hip arthroscopy always present. Development of blood clots (deep-vein thrombosis) is also a risk, probably created by the slowing of blood flow in the veins as a result of reduced mobility.

Damage to nerves around the hip joint can occur, sometimes because of direct damage with the surgical instruments, or as a result of the traction needed to gain access to the joint. For this reason, surgeons prefer to apply as little traction as possible, for as short a time as possible, in order to gain safe access to the joint. The most common nerve to be injured is the lateral cutaneous nerve of the thigh. This nerve supplies feeling to the upper, outer thigh. Other nerves that may be affected are the sciatic (leading to a weakness lifting the foot – 'foot-drop'), femoral (weak thigh muscles), obturator (numbness in the inner thigh and weakness of those muscles), and pudendal nerves. The pudendal nerves supply feeling to the reproductive organs. Persistent inflammation to the soft tissue structures around the hip after hip arthroscopy is not uncommon. This is usually self-limiting and improves with time, although occasionally requires anti-inflammatory treatment. The most commonly affected area is around the outside of the hip (greater trochanter), although inflammation of iliopsoas (the muscle which passes directly over the front of the hip) can also occur.

As with all arthroscopic procedures, because the hip arthroscopy is undertaken with fluid in the joint, there is a risk that some can escape into the surrounding tissues during surgery and cause local swelling. Occasionally, this causes skin blistering. However, swelling usually resolves after 24 hours without intervention. Very rarely some of this irrigation fluid can track upwards into the abdomen. Should this occur, the patient may complain of back pain immediately after surgery.

== Postoperative rehabilitation ==
Each surgeon will have their own preferred physiotherapy schedule. Many are on their individual websites. A variable period on crutches after hip arthroscopy is common although physiotherapy is seen by many to play a very significant part in post-operative recovery. The regime usually starts with encouragement for a free range of movement, stretches and isometric exercises leading to subsequent dynamic, plyometric and weights exercises. Impact activities are usually discouraged for a minimum of three months, and contact sports for four. Using a simple stationery pedal device the first day after surgery can be key to immediate flexibility and mobility after surgery.

== Results ==
The results of hip arthroscopic techniques will depend on the indication for the operation and perhaps also on the experience of the surgeon. Published reports are certainly encouraging, and the number of research papers reporting the results of hip arthroscopic surgery is increasing rapidly. As an approximation, for FAI surgery undertaken arthroscopically, 80% of patients feel their hips are improved one year after the operation, 15% feel their symptoms are unaltered while 5% may be made worse. If the procedure is being performed for early arthritis (wear and tear), the results are not as clear-cut, and a larger proportion may not feel benefit.

== Anatomy ==
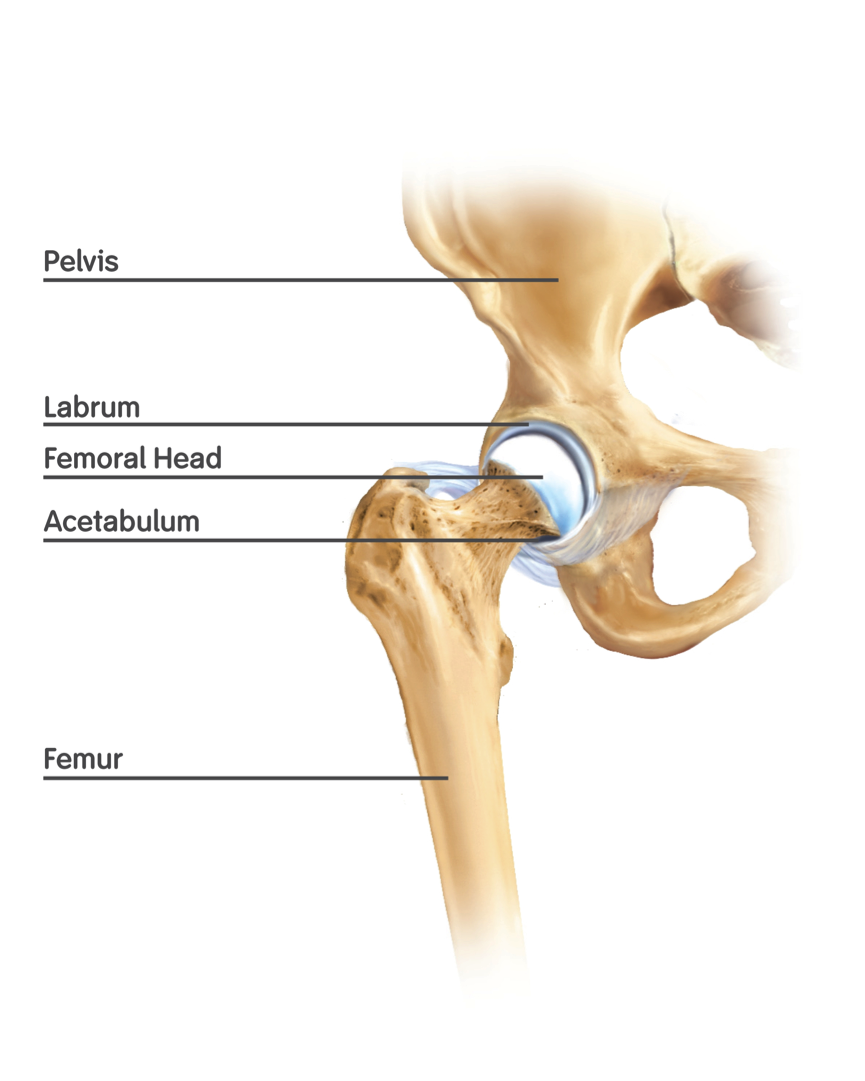
Figure 1. Basic anatomy of the hip joint

The hip is essentially a ball and socket joint. It consists of the head of the femur (the ball) and the acetabulum (the socket). Both the ball and socket are congruous and covered with hyaline (or articular) cartilage, which allows smooth, almost frictionless gliding between the two surfaces. The edge of the acetabulum is surrounded by the acetabular labrum, a fibrous structure that envelops the femoral head. (See fig. 1) The labrum acts as a seal, or gasket, around the femoral head. However, this is not its only function, as it has been shown to contain nerve endings, which may cause pain if damaged. The blood supply of the labrum has also been demonstrated. The joint itself is encompassed by a thick, fibrous joint capsule, which is lined by synovium. The ligaments that keep the hip joint in place are in fact, thickened areas of joint capsule, rather than distinct structures. The synovium generates fluid that lubricates the joint; in that fluid are the nutrients needed to keep the cartilage cells alive. A total of 27 muscles cross the hip joint, making it a very deep part of the body for arthroscopic access. This is one reason why hip arthroscopy can be quite technically demanding.

The cartilage lining of the socket is in the shape of an inverted horseshoe. The middle of this is termed the cotyloid fossa. Arising from the cotyloid fossa and connecting to the femoral head lies the ligamentum teres. The function of this in the adult is under debate, but in childhood the ligamentum teres carries a blood vessel from the pelvis to the femoral head. This blood vessel usually becomes redundant with age. Arthroscopic hip surgeons are becoming increasingly convinced that the ligamentum teres acts as an internal stabiliser of the hip joint, and pathological injury to the ligament is now a recognised cause of hip pain and instability.
