= Hip pain =

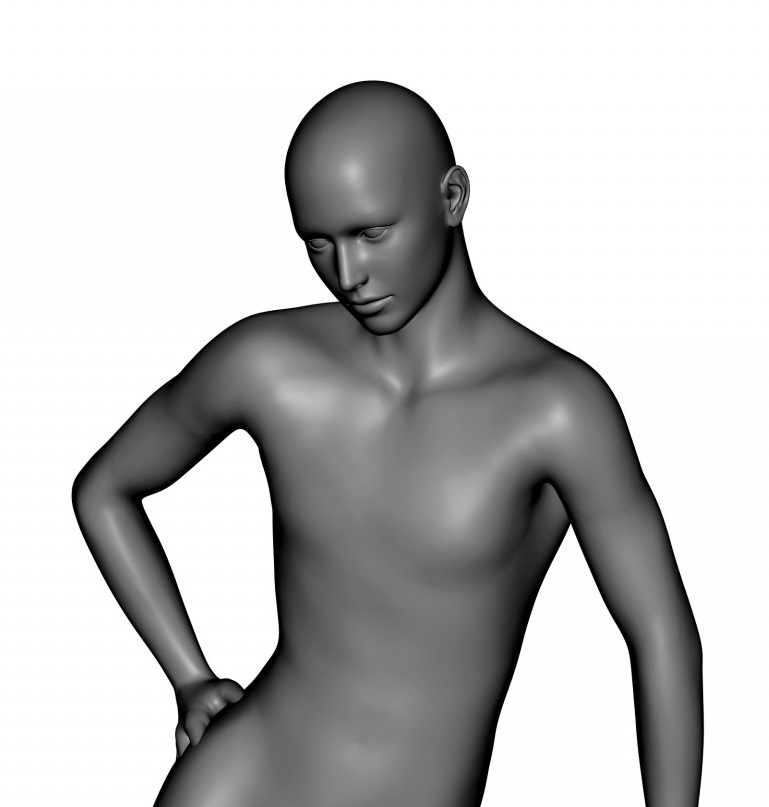

Pain in the hip is the experience of pain in the muscles or joints in the hip/ pelvic region, a condition commonly arising from any of a number of factors. Sometimes it is closely associated with lower back pain.

== Causes ==
Causes of pain around the hip joint may be intra-articular, extra-articular, or referred pain from neighboring structures, such as sacroiliac joint, spine, symphysis pubis, or the inguinal canal.

Common etiologies include:

- Trochanteric bursitis, caused by inflammation of the trochanteric bursa of the outer hip, often affecting both hips
- Arthritis of the hip, degeneration of the hip joint from osteonecrosis, trauma, sepsis, rheumatoid arthritis, or anatomic anomalies
- Meralgia paresthetica, a chronic neurological disorder of the lateral femoral cutaneous nerve, most common among those who are pregnant or have diabetes
- Hip avascular necrosis, cell death of bone tissue in the hip joint brought on by vascular occlusion or coagulation which is the result of old age, alcoholism, trauma, decompression sickness, or several other possible causes; the treatment is often total hip replacement
- Occult hip fracture, a fine crack somewhere in the hip socket, common in elderly women and those with osteoporosis, usually only in one hip
- Snapping hip, a condition caused by iliotibial band snap, iliopsoas tendon snap, and hip labral tear, usually only in one hip; may be accompanied by an audible "snap" when the hip joint is moved
- Paget's disease, enlarged or deformed bones of the hip, a genetic disorder; pain is usually in both hips simultaneously
- Malignancy, as cancer in the pelvis or proximal femur may cause pain; usually only one hip is affected
- Primary septic arthritis caused by an infection within the synovial fluid of the hip, a condition rare in adults except for those who are already immunocompromised as well as those who have artificial hips; only one side of the pelvis is affected, onset of pain is rapid
- Transient or acute synovitis or "irritable hip", a condition most common in children, more often in boys than girls, and clearing up on its own within 7–10 days; pain is only on one side
- Sciatica, a condition most often brought on by damage to the L4 or L5 nerve roots but sometimes caused by inflammation or tension in the piriformis muscle of the pelvis (which rests on the sciatic nerve), in which case the condition is called piriformis syndrome; pain usually only occurs in one side but may occur in the other side at other times or (rarely) both sides simultaneously
- Sacroiliac joint dysfunction, an uncommon neurological condition of the mostly-immobile sacroiliac joint of the hip brought on by previous trauma to the joint such as an automobile accident; pain will usually be in only one side
- Radiculopathy, a nerve disorder brought on by pressure or irritation of a nerve at its root (i.e., near the spine) often resulting from degeneration of a spinal disc, joint degeneration, or osteoarthritis, among other causes

Pain in the groin, called anterior hip pain, is most often the result of osteoarthritis, osteonecrosis, occult fracture, acute synovitis, and septic arthritis; pain on the sides of the hip, called lateral hip pain, is usually caused by bursitis; pain in the buttock, called posterior or gluteal hip pain, which is the least common type of hip pain, is most often caused by sacroiliac joint dysfunction as well as sciatica (whether from a hemorrhaged spinal disk or a tense piriformis muscle). Herpes zoster (shingles) may also cause posterior hip pain.

== Clinical examination ==
Clinical tests are adapted to identify the source of pain as intra-articular or extra-articular. The flexion-abduction-external rotation (FABER), internal range of motion with overpressure (IROP), and scour tests show sensitivity values in identifying individuals with intra-articular pathology ranging from 0.62 to 0.91.

== Medical imaging ==
Projectional radiography ("X-ray") is the first imaging technique of choice in hip pain, not only in older people with suspected osteoarthritis but also in young people without any such suspicion. In this case plain radiography allows categorization as normal hip or dysplastic hip, or with impingement signs, pincer, cam, or a combination of both.

=== Need for clinical correlation ===
Imaging of the hip needs to be complementary to the clinical history and physical examination because it is well known that imaging findings do not always correlate with the presence of pain and vice versa.

=== X-Ray ===
Projectional radiography ("X-ray") is currently useful not only in older people in whom osteoarthritis of the hip is suspected but also in younger people without osteoarthritis, who are being evaluated for femoroacetabular impingement (FAI) or hip dysplasia.

Plain radiography allows us to categorize the hip as normal or dysplastic or with impingement signs (pincer, cam, or a combination of both). Besides these, pathologic processes like osteoarthritis, inflammatory diseases, infection, or tumors can also be identified (Figure 1).

Figure 1.

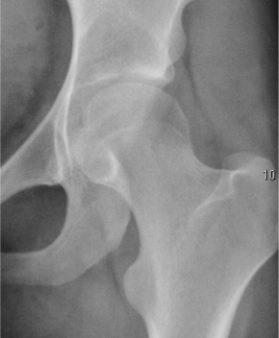
Radiography in normal hip

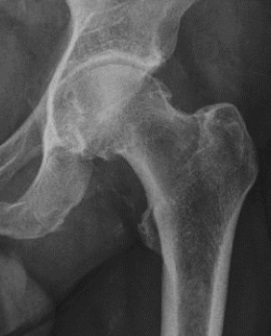
X-ray in pincer impingement type of hip dysplasia

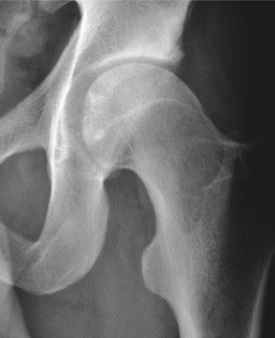
X-ray of cam

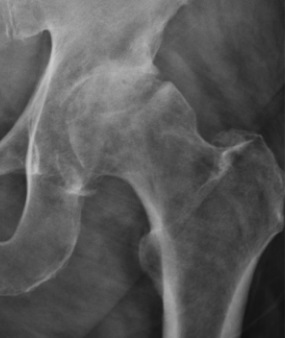
Hip in osteoarthritis

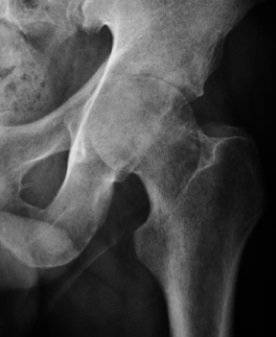
Septic arthritis

==== X-ray in pediatrics ====
X-ray of infants should be obtained with the pelvis in neutral position with the lower limbs held in neutral rotation and slight flexion.

Hip dysplasia

Despite the widespread of ultrasound, pelvis X-ray is still frequently used to diagnose and/or monitor hip dysplasia or for assessing other congenital conditions or bone tumors.

The most useful lines and angles that can be drawn in the pediatric pelvis assessing DDH are as follows:

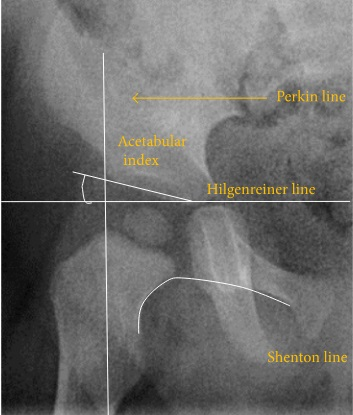
Figure 2A. Normal hip.

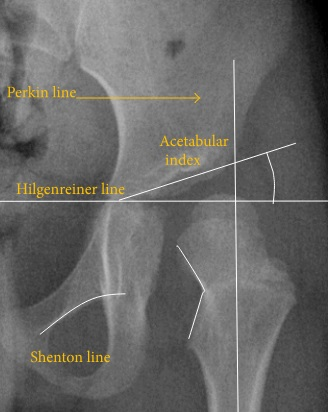
Figure 2B. Hip dysplasia.

Joint effusion

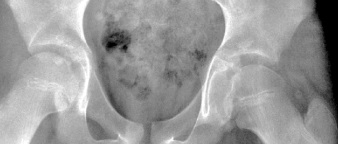
Figure 2C. AP view of a patient with left hip effusion secondary to trauma showing widening of the medial joint space.

Legg-Calvé-Perthes disease (LCPD)

Most cases of Legg-Calvé-Perthes disease (LCPD) develop between the ages of 4 and 10 years (Figure 3). Classification of its severity can be assessed by radiographs. Herring or lateral pillar classifications and the patient’s age strongly correlate with the outcome.

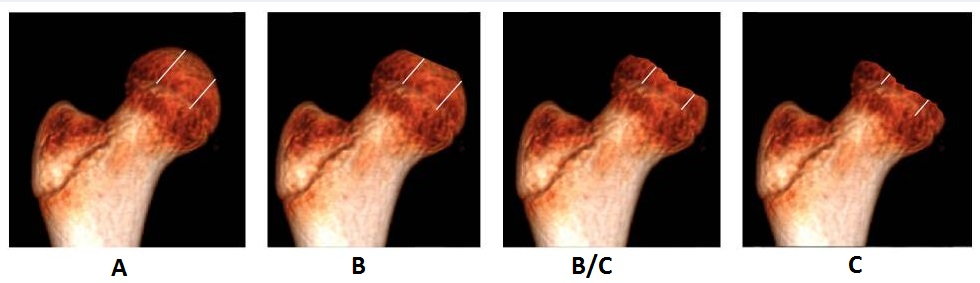
Figure 3A. Herring lateral pillar classification

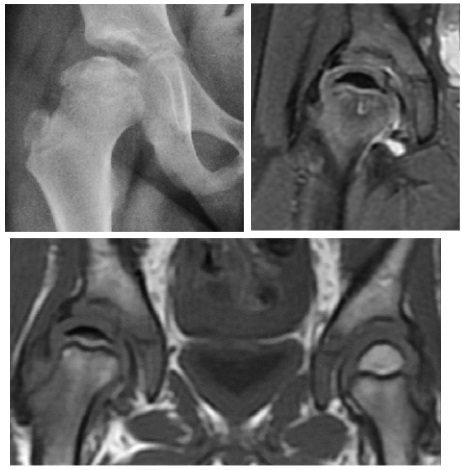
Figure 3B. AP radiograph (e), coronal T1 (f), and PD fat sat (g) weighted images showing loss of fat signal of the epiphysis, edema, and cyst formation in femoral metaphysis in a grade C Perthes disease.

In Group A, which has a better prognosis, there are no loss of height in the lateral third of the femoral head and little density changes; in Group B, there is lucency and lateral height loss of less than 50%; and in Group C, the most severe form, there is more than 50% loss of lateral height. Group B/C is considered when the loss of lateral pillar height is at 50%. People who are over the age of 8 years at the time of onset and have a hip in the lateral pillar B group or B/C border group have a better outcome with surgical treatment than they do with conservative treatment. Group B hips in children who are less than 8 years at the time of onset have a very favorable outcome unrelated to the treatment, whereas Group C hips in children of all ages usually have poor outcome unrelated to the treatment.

Slipped capital femoral epiphyses (SCFE)

Slipped capital femoral epiphyses (SCFE) usually affect 11- to 14-year-old adolescents (Figure 4). Radiographs may show widening and irregularity of the physis and posterior inferior displacement of the capital femoral epiphysis. On the AP view Klein’s line, tangent to the lateral aspect of the femoral neck, does not intersect the femoral head indicating that it is displaced. SCFE may compromise the blood supply to the femoral head and cause avascular necrosis, mainly when there is instability between the fragments.

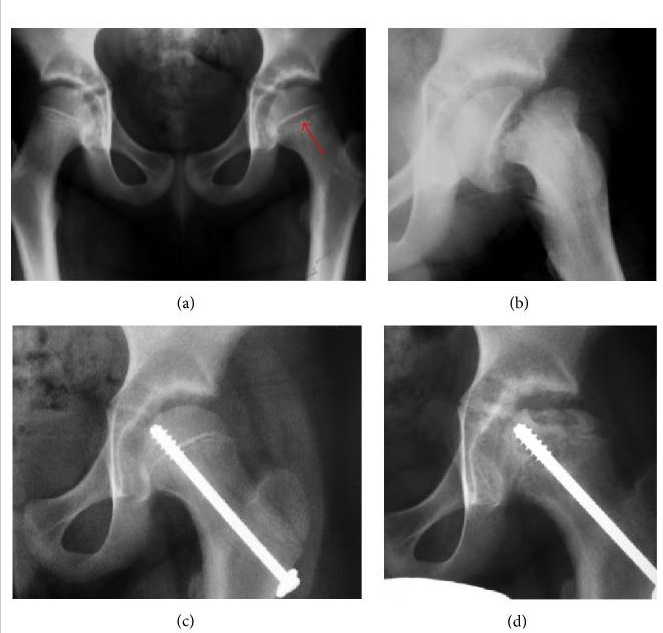
Figure 4: (a) X-ray of a 10-year-old child with left hip pain. It was considered normal at emergency despite the widening of the left physis (arrow). Two weeks later epiphysiolysis was evident (b). Despite appropriate surgical reduction (c) osteonecrosis developed and femoral head collapsed 1 month later (d).

==== X-ray in adults ====
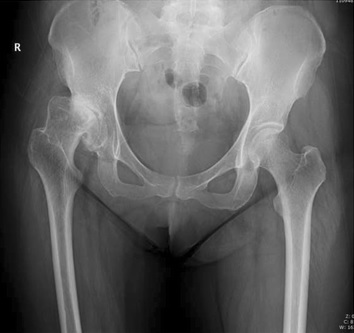
X-ray of the hips of a 40-year-old female, with dysplasia of her right hip.

Hip dysplasia

Measurements of hip dysplasia in adults are quite different from those in children.

Osteoarthritis

In adults, one of the main indications for radiographs is the detection of osteoarthritic changes (Figure 1(e)). Nevertheless, radiographs usually detect advanced osteoarthritis that can be graded according to the Tönnis classifications. The grading system ranges from 0 to 3, where 0 shows no sign of osteoarthritis. Intermediate grade 1 shows mild sclerosis of the head and acetabulum, slight joint space narrowing, and marginal osteophyte lipping. Grade 2 presents with small cysts in the femoral head or acetabulum, moderate joint space narrowing, and moderate loss of sphericity of the femoral head. Grade 3 is the severest form of osteoarthritis, which manifests as severe narrowing of the joint space, large subchondral cyst with productive bone changes that may lead to deformity of the bone components of the joint, while secondary osteoarthritis due to calcium pyrophosphate deposition can be diagnosed when calcification of hyaline cartilage and fibrocartilage is detected.

There are other pathological conditions that can affect the hip joint and radiographs help to make the appropriate diagnosis. Acute bacterial septic arthritis can be diagnosed by radiographs when a fast regional osteoporosis and destructive monoarticular process develops (Figure 1(f)). In case of tuberculous or brucella arthritis it is manifested as a slow progressive process, and diagnosis may be delayed.

Synovial chondromatosis can be confidently diagnosed by X-ray when calcified cartilaginous chondromas are seen. However, other synovial proliferative processes, such as pigmented villonodular synovitis, require MRI for accurate diagnosis, although noncalcified synovitis can be suspected in radiographs by indirect signs, such as soft tissue swelling and/or erosions in the femoral head, femoral neck, or acetabulum (Figure 7).

Figure 7:

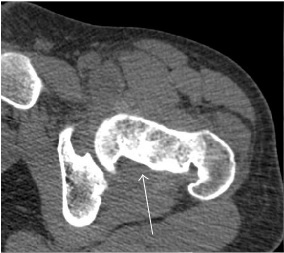
Axial CT image of pigmented villonodular synovitis eroding the posterior cortex of the femoral neck.

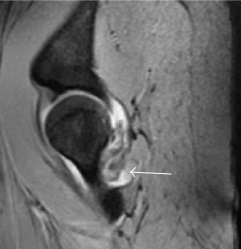
Sagittal T2* gradient echo image showing a posterior soft tissue mass with hypointense areas secondary to hemosiderin deposition.

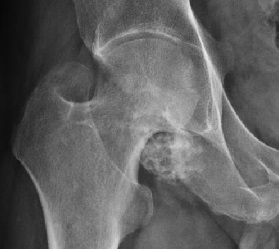
X-ray of synovial chondromatosis.

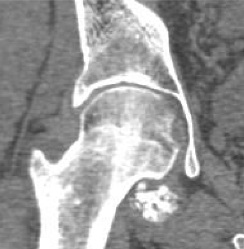
CT of synovial chondromatosis.

Radiological signs of transient osteoporosis of the hip include localized osteoporosis of the femoral head and neck (Figure 8). Nevertheless, final diagnosis has to be made with MRI to differentiate it from avascular necrosis and from insufficiency or stress fractures of the femoral head or neck. In case of AVN, radiographs can only demonstrate delayed or advanced signs. Staging according to Ficat classification ranges between normal appearance (stage I), slight increased density in the femoral head (stage II), subchondral collapse of the femoral head with or without “crescent” sign (stage III), and advanced collapse with secondary osteoarthritis (stage IV). In the case of stress or insufficiency fractures X-ray sensitivity has been proven to be much lower than MRI, which is currently the gold standard.

Figure 8:

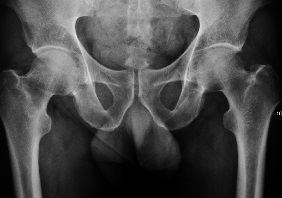
X-ray of a patient with transient osteoporosis of the left hip showing osteoporosis.

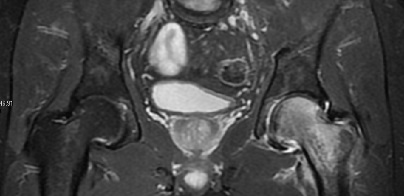
Coronal stir imaging in transient osteoporosis, showing diffuse edema.

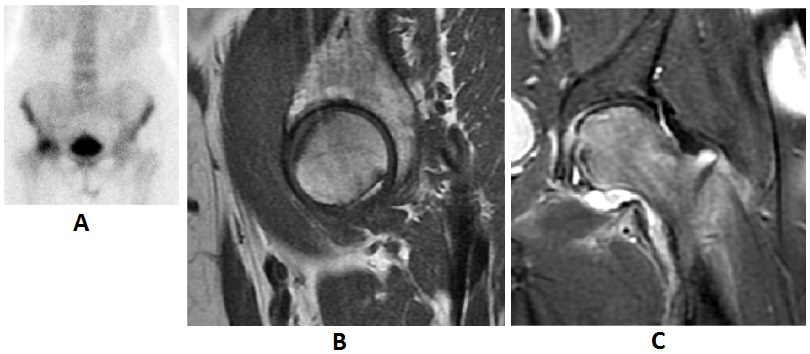
Scintigraphy (A), sagittal T1 (B), and coronal PD fat sat of a patient with a subchondral fracture of the femoral head with convex shape to the articular surface.

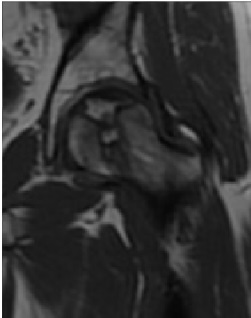
Coronal T1 of a patient with avascular necrosis of the femoral head.

=== Magnetic resonance imaging ===
Many pathological conditions of the hip are detected early by MRI due to its high soft tissue resolution and sensitivity. Its accuracy in studying acute hip pain in children has proved to be superior to ultrasound and plan film radiography. However, MRI accessibility and the need of sedation relegate its use to selected cases in which diagnosis is not clear with less demanding techniques. These include differentiating transient synovitis from a septic arthritis or osteomyelitis, diagnosis of inflammatory joint disease or bone tumors, and early detection and follow-up of Perthes disease.

MRI findings correlate with prognosis in LCPD. These include extent and distribution of epiphyseal necrosis, subchondral ossified nucleus fracture, involvement of the lateral pillar, and disturbance of physeal growth, including presence of transphyseal neovascularity or bridging.

Recent studies have been focused on the role of diffusion weighted MRI because it does not need contrast medium administration. ADC ratio of the femoral metaphysis was positively correlated with the Herring classification. ADC ratio superior to 1.63 indicates bad prognosis with 89% sensitivity and 58% specificity.

In adults, MRI is currently playing a definite role in the assessment of osteoarthritis. Although traditionally belonging to the arena of radiographs, the role of MRI has been stressed after the term femoral acetabular impingement was coined in 2003. Growing interest has been focused in accurate diagnosis of the acetabular and femoral morphological abnormalities that may lead to early osteoarthritis.

MR imaging is considered paramount to these objectives, mainly when surgery is considered, due to the ability of MRI to portray the whole section of the femoral neck surface, as well as to image the labrum and articular cartilage.

Diagnosis of impingement can only be achieved if, besides imaging findings, there are also clinical symptoms and positive impingement maneuvers.

Most of the angles and measurements described in the plain radiograph section can be accurately reproduced on MRI. In addition, the superiority of MRI resolution with intra-articular contrast allows detection of labral and chondral abnormalities that may influence the choice of medical, percutaneous, or surgical management (Figure 9).

Figure 9:

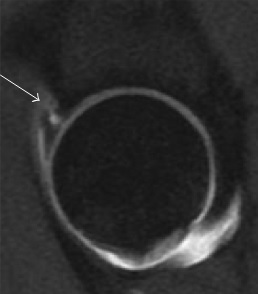
Sagittal T1 weighted image showing anterosuperior labral tear.

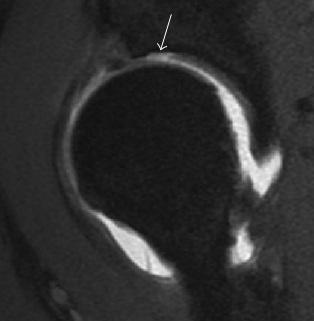
Sagittal T1 weighted image showing chondral lesion.

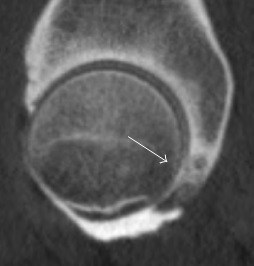
Sagittal CT-arthrography showing posteroinferior chondral injury.

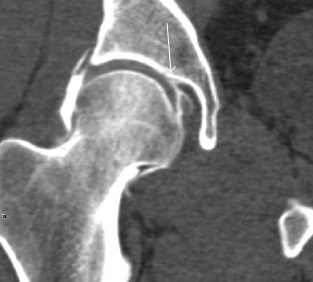
Coronal CT-arthrography (d) showing ligamentum teres tear.

MR arthrography has proven superior in accuracy when compared to native MR imaging. It is considered the best technique to assess the labrum. Knowledge of the normal variable morphology of the labrum helps to differentiate tears from normal variants. A triangular shape is most commonly seen in 66% of asymptomatic volunteers, but round, flattened, and absent labra can also be found in asymptomatic populations. MR arthrography has demonstrated sensitivity over 90% and specificity close to 100% in detecting labral tears. Loose bodies are demonstrated as filling defects surrounded by the hyperintense gadolinium.

Association between labral tears and chondral damage has been demonstrated. This underscores the interaction between cartilage and labrum damage in the progression of osteoarthritis. Chondral damage to the posteroinferior part of the acetabulum as a contrecoup lesion occurs in approximately one-third of pincer cases secondary to persistent abutment on the anterior part of the joint leading to a slight posteroinferior subluxation. This is considered a bad prognosis sign.

MR arthrography can also demonstrate ligamentum teres rupture or capsular laxity, which are debated causes of microinstability of the hip. Elongation of the capsule or injury to the iliofemoral ligament or labrum may be secondary to microtrauma in athletes. MR can demonstrate abnormalities in these cases, such as increased joint volume or a ligamentum teres tear (Figure 9).

Intra-articular osseous causes of pain include several conditions: avascular necrosis (AVN), transient osteoporosis of the hip (TOH), tumors, and stress or insufficiency fractures. All these entities may present with a pattern of bone marrow edema characterized by decreased signal intensity on T1 weighted images and increased signal intensity on fluid sensitive sequences, such as fat saturated T2-weighted or STIR images. When there is no evidence of a focal lesion associated with the edema pattern, TOH is suspected. When a band of low intensity is seen inside the edematous area, the shape and length of this band become important. It is generally convex to the articular surface in the case of subchondral stress or insufficiency fractures, whereas it is concave, circumscribing all of the necrotic segment, in cases of AVN. When doubts do persist, gadolinium-enhanced MRI tends to show that the proximal portion beyond the band is enhanced in fractures but is not in AVN.

MRI has been shown to have 100% sensitivity and specificity in prospective studies of occult hip fractures. These fractures were diagnosed by bone marrow edema and a low signal fracture line, mainly on T1 or T2 weighted images (Figure 10).

Figure 10:

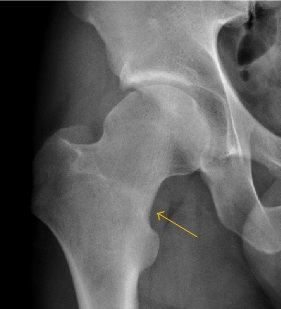
Stress femoral neck fracture in a young athlete barely visible in X-ray film as a sclerotic line (arrow)

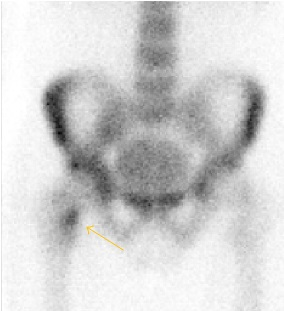
In this case, Tc 99 scintigraphy shows a band of uptake

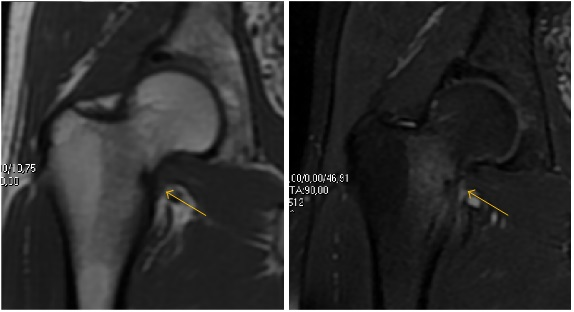
Furthermore, T1 (left) and DP fat saturated (right) weighted MR images showed the fracture line and a pattern of edema.

In synovial proliferative disorders, MRI demonstrates synovial hypertrophy. In the case of PVNS, characteristic foci of low signal intensity related to hemosiderin deposition are better seen on gradient echo T2* images (Figure 7). In the case of synovial osteochondromatosis, the synovial hypertrophy is accompanied by intermediate signal cartilaginous loose bodies and/or low signal calcified loose bodies.

=== Computed Tomography ===
Due to radiation concerns, CT has been relegated after MRI in the study of intra-articular causes of hip pain. The only exception where CT is considered superior to MRI is in bone tumors, because of its ability in characterizing matrix calcifications, and in depicting the anatomy of acute traumatic fractures. Typical matrix calcifications include the following: (a) osteoid mineralization, like a dense cloud, (b) chondroid calcification, reproducing a punctate popcorn pattern, or (c) fibrous calcification, ground glass-like appearance. There are also tumors that typically do not show matrix calcification. CT is also used for accurate localization of the nidus in osteoid osteomas and this must be differentiated from Brodie’s abscess or a stress fracture. The current standard treatment of osteoid osteoma is percutaneous radiofrequency ablation and this is usually performed under CT guidance.

Quite often, CT is widely available unlike MRI, especially in the acute setting. CT is performed in this setting when doubt about the existence of a fracture persists following plain radiograph. Modern multidetector computed tomography (MDCT) shows results comparable with MRI for detecting occult fractures.

Due to the submillimeter resolution of MDCT arthrography, many authors consider this technique complementary to MR arthrography. It may even have superior sensitivity in detecting cartilage pathology, but lesser detecting labral tears.

CT can also be used to obtain accurate measurement of the femoral version and torsion. The femoral version is measured by an angle formed between a line through the femoral head-neck axis and another horizontal line drawn between both ischial tuberosities. Normal values range between 5 and 25°. Retroversion is considered abnormal.

Femoral torsion is the angle between a line along the femoral head and neck axis and a second line that is touching the posterior border of both femoral condyles. The normal value at birth is approximately 32° and decreases gradually with age. In adults, the normal value ranges from 10° to 20°.

=== Ultrasound ===
Ultrasound is the first-choice technique for diagnosis of newborns hip dysplasia. In experienced hands with appropriate technology, ultrasound can also be useful during the first year of life. Some European healthcare systems encourage universal ultrasound screening in neonates between the sixth and eighth weeks. Although it shows higher initial costs caused, it leads to significant reduction in the total number and overall costs of dysplastic hips undergoing operative and nonoperative treatment.

Ultrasound allows categorizing pediatric hips, according to Graf’s criteria, in four main types: normal, immature, and dysplastic (subluxed and dislocated). This classification is based on measurements of the acetabular inclination angle (alpha), cartilage roof angle (beta), and infant age. The femoral head coverage can also be determined by dividing the length of the femoral head covered by the acetabular fossa and the diameter of the femoral head. Its lower normal limits are 47% for boys and 44% for girls (Figure 11).

Figure 11:

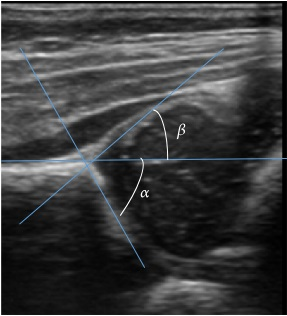
Useful ultrasound measures in neonatal hip sonography, alpha and beta angles.

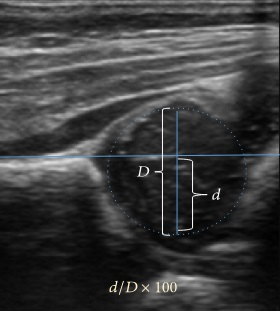
Measurement of femoral head coverage.

In a recent study, including newborns with high clinical suspicion for DDH (Ortolani/Barlow test, asymmetry in abduction of 20° or greater, breech presentation, leg-length discrepancy, and first-degree relative treated for DDH), hip sonography led to a change in clinical diagnosis in 52% of hips and to a change in management plan in 32% of hips. It obviated further follow-up in 23%, strengthening its role as an important technique reassuring the clinical diagnosis.

During childhood, ultrasound is a quick method to assess hip pain and quite often may be used to avoid use of irradiating techniques, such as radiography or CT. Ultrasound allows evaluation of joint effusion, synovial thickening and neovascularity, the bone/cartilage contour, and the femoral head-neck alignment. Although sonography is extremely sensitive in detecting increased synovial fluid, it is nonspecific and cannot be used with accuracy to determine the type of fluid. Transient synovitis of the hip, despite being the most frequent cause of pain in children between 3 and 10 years, remains a diagnosis of exclusion. It usually shows anechoic fluid, but echogenic fluid can also be found. The effusion is considered pathologic when it is measured at >2 mm in thickness. The differential diagnosis is wide, including osteomyelitis, septic arthritis, primary or metastatic lesions, LCPD, and SCFE. Discrimination from septic arthritis is challenging, often requiring joint aspiration. In septic arthritis, US is able to demonstrate a hip joint effusion, synovial thickening, and cartilage damage, although the appearances are nonspecific.

A step between the head and the physis can be detected in children with SCFE, while abnormalities in the femoral head contour may suggest the presence of LCPD. In both cases, radiographs are mandatory to confirm diagnosis and severity (Figure 12).

Figure 12:

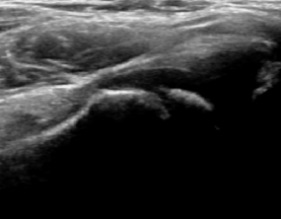
Normal ultrasound appearance of the femoral head-neck junction.

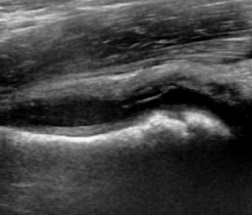
Joint effusion in transient synovitis of the hip.

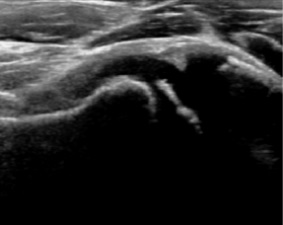
Flattening of the femoral head in a patient with Perthes disease.

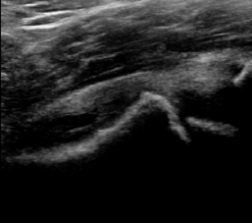
Step in the femoral head-neck junction in a patient with SCFE.

In adults, the most common application for US is to detect tendon or muscle injuries, effusion or synovitis within the hip joint or its adjacent bursae. Joint effusions may be due to many intra-articular processes and this may need another imaging technique to achieve a specific diagnosis.

=== Nuclear Medicine ===
Bone scanning in people with hip pain can be complementary to other imaging studies, mainly in indeterminate bone lesions to clarify whether it is an active lesion with abnormal radiotracer accumulation. Nevertheless, MRI has replaced scintigraphy in the diagnosis of most of these conditions. An example is stress or insufficiency fractures: increased uptake is usually present in around 80% of fractures within 24 h, and 95% of fractures reveal activity by 72 h following trauma, showing an overall sensitivity of 93% and specificity of 95%. MRI is superior to bone scans in terms of sensitivity (99%-100%) and specificity (100%). Moreover, a bone scan does not provide detailed anatomical location of the fracture, and further imaging is usually required.

== See also ==
- Hip examination
