= Amplified musculoskeletal pain syndrome =

Condition characterized by amplified and chronic pain

- Image showing hyperalgesia and allodynia, two common symptoms of AMPS, compared to normal pain levels in response to stimuli.
- Specialty: Rheumatology, Pediatrics, Psychiatry
- Symptoms: Chronic pain, allodynia, abdominal pain, anxiety, depression, dysphagia, dizziness, fatigue, headache, joint pain, movement issues, such as stiffness, shakiness, or coordination difficulty, swelling, fast heart rate, skin texture, color, or temperature changes, paresthesia, changes in nail or hair growth
- Complications: Major depressive disorder, anxiety, psychological stress, osteoporosis, muscle atrophy
- Usual onset: Childhood and adolescence. Some evidence shows 14 years of age to be an average.
- Types: Complex regional pain syndrome, diffuse idiopathic pain (also known as juvenile fibromyalgia), intermittent amplified pain, localized amplified pain
- Causes: Psychological trauma, physical injury, illness
- Risk factors: Asthma, autoimmune diseases, arthritis, tendonitis, myositis, Ehlers–Danlos syndrome, rheumatologic diseases, female sex
- Diagnostic method: Full overview of patient history and out rule of potential physical causes
- Differential diagnosis: Myofascial pain syndrome, idiopathic chronic pain, degenerative disc disease, lordosis, greater trochanteric pain syndrome
- Management: Aerobic exercise, massage therapy to desensitize physical contact, occupational therapy, physical therapy, psychotherapy, medication (selective serotonin reuptake inhibitors), procedures and injections
- Medication: Selective serotonin reuptake inhibitors
- Prognosis: Good
- Frequency: 2–6% of children have a mild case of AMPS.

Amplified musculoskeletal pain syndrome (AMPS) is an condition characterized by notable pain intensity without an identifiable physical cause.

Characteristic symptoms include skin sensitivity to light touch, also known as allodynia. Associated symptoms may include changes associated with disuse including changes in skin texture, color, and temperature, and changes in hair and nail growth. In up to 80% of cases, symptoms are associated with psychological trauma or psychological stress. AMPS may also follow physical injury or illness. Other associations with AMPS include Ehlers–Danlos syndrome, myositis, arthritis, and other rheumatologic diseases.

Treatment for notable pain intensity without identifiable pathophysiology can include psychotherapy to alleviate psychological stress. Physical therapists, psychologically informed physical therapists in particular, can coach people on exercises they can do everyday at home. Clinicians who use this diagnosis sometimes apply it to children and adolescents. To date, this diagnosis is used more in women.

== Classification ==
AMPS is classified into four different types, of which may be divided into multiple sub-types. This includes complex regional pain syndrome, diffuse idiopathic pain, intermittent amplified pain, and localized amplified pain, which is characterized by disproportionate pain without the disuse associated with CRPS.

=== Complex regional pain syndrome ===
Complex regional pain syndrome is characterized by any amount of spontaneous regional pain lasting longer than the expected recovery time of an observed physical trauma, or other injury. This includes two separate types: type I and type II. Type I CRPS, formerly known as reflex sympathetic dystrophy (RSD) or "Sudeck's atrophy", refers to CRPS without any observed nerve damage. Type II, formerly known as causalgia, refers to CRPS with observed nerve damage. The symptoms description for AMPS above is also used for CRPS: characteristic symptoms include skin sensitivity to light touch, also known as allodynia. Associated symptoms may include changes associated with disuse including stiffness and changes in skin texture, color, and temperature, and changes in hair and nail growth.

=== Diffuse idiopathic pain ===
This type of AMPS includes full-body pain. It is also known as juvenile fibromyalgia.

=== Intermittent amplified pain ===
This type of AMPS refers to amplified pain that varies in intensity over time.

=== Localized amplified pain ===
This refers to localized amplified pain without other symptoms. This type cannot include symptoms such as swelling; skin texture, color, or temperature changes; or perspiration. Observation of these symptoms implies the diagnosis of complex regional pain syndrome.

== Signs and symptoms ==
Amplified musculoskeletal pain is a syndrome which is a set of characteristic symptoms and signs. The syndrome is characterized by diffuse, ongoing, daily pain associated with relatively high levels of incapability and greater care-seeking behavior. The discomfort can be in the skin (allodynia), abdomen, throat (dysphagia), headache, and joints. There can be other somatic symptoms such as, movement issues, dizziness, fatigue, stiffness, shakiness, coordination difficulty, swelling, fast heart rate, skin texture, color, or temperature changes, paresthesia, and changes in nail or hair growth. These symptoms are associated with symptoms of anxiety, depression, psychological trauma, and psychological stress.

=== Examination ===
Findings on examination can include factors associated with disuse including swelling; changes in skin texture, color, and temperature; changes in nail and hair growth, muscle atrophy, and radiographic osteoporosis.

== Causes ==
It's not possible to discuss causes when there is no objectively verifiable pathophysiology. It's more accurate to describe when patients and clinicians might find this diagnosis appealing.

=== Psychological trauma ===
Psychological trauma is strongly associated with unexplained pain conceptualized as AMPS.

=== Physical injury ===
The combination of physical injury, such as a bone fracture or surgery, and over protectiveness and disuse can be referred to as complex regional pain syndrome, a type of AMPS that is isolated to one region of the body, such as a hand or foot.

== Risk factors ==
There are various risk factors for Amplified Musculoskeletal Pain Syndrome. Inflammatory conditions, including asthma, arthritis, tendonitis, and myositis are risk factors for the syndrome. Viral infections, including mononucleosis and influenza are also associated with an increased risk of developing this condition. Ehlers–Danlos syndrome and other rheumatologic diseases are associated with developing AMPS.. Additionally, female children are at an increased risk for the syndrome.

== Rationale ==
AMPS is theoretical rather than experimental. The amplified pain is conceptualized as incorrect sympathetic nervous system signals also known as the "fight or flight" nerves. This idea is that this would cause an involuntary response to pain, including vein constriction. This causes increased heart rate, increase in muscle tone, increased respiratory rate, and a reduce of blood flow to the muscles and bone, resulting in an increase in waste products, such as lactic acid. This buildup of waste products, as well as depletion of oxygen, is conceptualized as resulting in the amplified pain associated with AMPS.

== Diagnosis ==
Because AMPS is a syndrome and does not correspond to an objectively measurable pathophysiology, the diagnosis is made on the basis of the characteristic symptoms and signs. The diagnosis is used by some clinicians when multiple diagnoses of other physical conditions before the diagnosis of AMPS are deemed inappropriate.

The condition is diagnosed through observation of various patient traits. A full overview of the patients medical history, as well as out rule of any potention physical causes, such as a bone fracture. If no physical causes are observed, a diagnosis of AMPS is likely possible. Other common steps that are taken may include bone scans to detect possible signs of reduced blood flow; magnetic resonance imaging (MRI) to detect possible edema, or muscle atrophy; Nerve testing can be used to look for pain or sensitivity issues; and X-rays can detect osteoporosis as the result of AMPS. While all of these tests can detect possible signs of AMPS, better outcomes are usually made with less tests, and immediate treatment of AMPS without looking for possible differential diagnoses.

== Management ==
AMPS has no one specific cure for it. Management of the condition is a process of patients learning to manage the abnormal amplified pain. This can include a combination of treating the cause(s) of the condition, as well as managing the symptoms of the condition.

=== Medication ===
As psychological stress accounts for up to 80% of cases of AMPS, medication often involves typical antidepressants. These are also often prescribed for chronic pain due to the impact they have on serotonin and its impact on muscular pain and control. Many providers also use an injectable medication for treatment of AMPS. Opioid use is not recommended for most AMPS cases, as it can worsen recovery, and in rare cases, make the condition worse.

=== Physical therapy ===
Physical treatment of AMPS is very common and is shown to have long term benefit. This includes physical therapy, massage therapy, and aerobic exercise. Physical therapy involves training the use of the affected limb or training the use of the body. This is for the purpose of retraining muscles after muscle atrophy, and retraining how to use the affected muscles with less amplified pain.

Massage therapy is used to desensitize the affected area or body so it can build a tolerance to pain. This can help with symptoms such as allodynia and hyperalgesia in AMPS, as well as indirectly help with other common symptoms by relieving the patient of pain which could have been the cause of psychological stress, depression, anxiety, as well as a number of physiological conditions, including headaches.
