= Greater trochanteric pain syndrome =

Medical condition characterized by inflammation of the hip area

- Other names: Trochanteric bursitis
- Treatment: Amplified musculoskeletal pain syndrome

Greater trochanteric pain syndrome (GTPS), a form of bursitis, is inflammation of the trochanteric bursa, a part of the hip.

This bursa is at the top, outer side of the femur, between the insertion of the gluteus medius and gluteus minimus muscles into the greater trochanter of the femur and the femoral shaft. It has the function, in common with other bursae, of working as a shock absorber and as a lubricant for the movement of the muscles adjacent to it.

Occasionally, this bursa can become inflamed and clinically painful and tender. This condition can be a manifestation of an injury (often resulting from a twisting motion or from overuse), but sometimes arises for no obviously definable cause. The symptoms are pain in the hip region on walking, and tenderness over the upper part of the femur, which may result in the inability to lie in comfort on the affected side.

More often the lateral hip pain is caused by a disease of the gluteal tendons that secondarily inflames the bursa. This is most common in middle-aged women and is associated with chronic and debilitating pain which does not respond to conservative treatment. Other causes of trochanteric bursitis include uneven leg length, iliotibial band syndrome, and weakness of the hip abductor muscles.

Greater trochanteric pain syndrome can remain incorrectly diagnosed for years, because it shares the same pattern of pain with many other musculoskeletal conditions. Thus people with this condition may be labeled malingerers, or may undergo many ineffective treatments due to misdiagnosis. It may also coexist with low back pain, arthritis, and obesity.

== Signs and symptoms ==
The primary symptom is hip pain, especially hip pain on the outer (lateral) side of the joint. This pain may appear when the affected person is walking or lying down on that side.

== Diagnosis ==
A doctor may begin the diagnosis by asking the patient to stand on one leg and then the other, while observing the effect on the position of the hips. Palpating the hip and leg may reveal the location of the pain, and range-of-motion tests can help to identify its source.

X-rays, ultrasound and magnetic resonance imaging may reveal tears or swelling. But often these imaging tests do not reveal any obvious abnormality in patients with documented GTPS.

== Prevention ==
Because wear on the hip joint traces to the structures that support it (the posture of the legs, and ultimately, the feet), proper fitting shoes with adequate support are important to preventing GTPS. For someone who has flat feet, wearing proper orthotic inserts and replacing them as often as recommended are also important preventive measures.

Strength in the core and legs is also important to posture, so physical training also helps to prevent GTPS. But it is equally important to avoid exercises that damage the hip.

== Treatment ==
Conservative treatments have a 90% success rate and can include any or a combination of the following: pain relief medication, NSAIDs, physiotherapy, shockwave therapy (SWT) and corticosteroid injection. Surgery is usually for cases that are non-respondent to conservative treatments and is often a combination of bursectomy, iliotibial band (ITB) release, trochanteric reduction osteotomy or gluteal tendon repair. A 2011 review found that traditional nonoperative treatment helped most patients, low-energy SWT was a good alternative, and surgery was effective in refractory cases and superior to corticosteroid therapy and physical therapy. There are numerous case reports in which surgery has relieved GTPS, but its effectiveness is not documented in clinical trials as of 2009.

The primary treatment is rest. This does not mean bed rest or immobilizing the area but avoiding actions which result in aggravation of the pain. Icing the joint may help. A non-steroidal anti-inflammatory drug may relieve pain and reduce the inflammation. If these are ineffective, the definitive treatment is steroid injection into the inflamed area.

Physical therapy to strengthen the hip muscles and stretch the iliotibial band can relieve tension in the hip and reduce friction. The use of point ultrasound may be helpful, and is undergoing clinical trials.

In extreme cases, where the pain does not improve after physical therapy, cortisone shots, and anti-inflammatory medication, the inflamed bursa can be removed surgically. The procedure is known as a bursectomy. Tears in the muscles may also be repaired, and loose material from arthritic degeneration of the hip removed. At the time of bursal surgery, a very close examination of the gluteal tendons will reveal sometimes subtle and sometimes very obvious degeneration and detachment of the gluteal tendons. If this detachment is not repaired, removal of the bursa alone will make little or no difference to the symptoms.

The bursa is not required, so the main potential complication is potential reaction to anaesthetic. The surgery can be performed arthroscopically and, consequently, on an outpatient basis. Patients often have to use crutches for a few days following surgery up to a few weeks for more involved procedures.

== See also ==
- Snapping hip syndrome
