= Snapping hip syndrome =

- Other names: Coxa saltans, iliopsoas tendinitis, dancer's hip
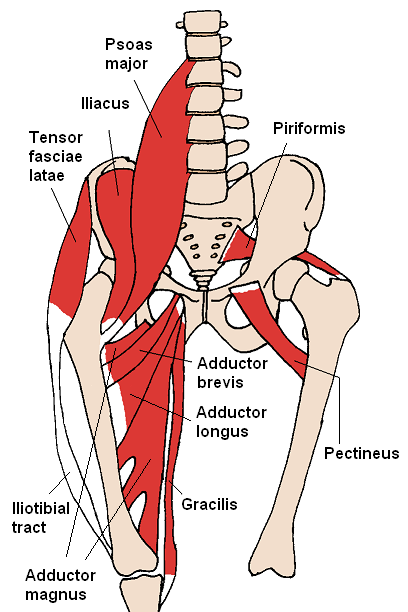
- Anterior hip muscles
- Specialty: Rheumatology, Rehabilitation

Snapping hip syndrome, also referred to as dancer's hip, is a medical condition characterized by a snapping sensation felt when the hip is flexed and extended. This may be accompanied by a snapping or popping noise and pain or discomfort. Pain often decreases with rest and diminished activity. Snapping hip syndrome is commonly classified by the location of the snapping as either extra- articular or intra-articular.

== Symptoms ==
In some cases, an audible snapping or popping noise as the tendon at the hip flexor crease moves from flexion (knee toward waist) to extension (knee down and hip joint straightened). It can be painless. After extended exercise, pain or discomfort may be present caused by inflammation of the iliopsoas bursae. Pain often decreases with rest and diminished activity. Symptoms usually last months or years without treatment and can be very painful.

=== Extra-articular ===
- Lateral extra articular

The more common lateral extra-articular type of snapping hip syndrome occurs when the iliotibial band, tensor fasciae latae, or gluteus medius tendon slides back and forth across the greater trochanter. This normal action becomes a snapping hip syndrome when one of these connective tissue bands thickens and catches with motion. The underlying bursa may also become inflamed, causing a painful external snapping hip syndrome.

- Medial extra-articular

Less commonly, the iliopsoas tendon catches on the anterior inferior iliac spine, the lesser trochanter, or the iliopectineal ridge during hip extension, as the tendon moves from an anterior lateral (front, side) to a posterior medial (back, middle) position. With overuse, the resultant friction may eventually cause painful symptoms, resulting in muscle trauma, bursitis, or inflammation in the area.

=== Intra-articular ===
Because the iliopsoas or hip flexor crosses directly over the anterior superior labrum of the hip, an intra-articular hip derangement (i.e. labral tears, hip impingement, loose bodies) can lead to an effusion that subsequently produces internal snapping hip symptoms.

== Causes ==
The causes of snapping hip syndrome are not fully understood. However, of the competitive ballet dancers, almost 90% reported symptoms of snapping hip syndrome and 80% had bilateral involvement. Ballet movements that provoke snapping include external hip rotation and abduction at or over 90 degrees.The onset is often insidious with reports of a "non-painful" sensation or audible snapping, clicking, or popping with certain activities. Individuals often ignore the "snapping" sensation, which may lead to future discomfort with activity. Athletes appear to have an increased risk of snapping hip syndrome due to repetitive and physically demanding movements. Among athletes such as ballet dancers, gymnasts, horse riders, track and field athletes and soccer players, military training, or any vigorous exerciser, repeated hip flexion can lead to injury. In excessive weightlifting or running, the cause is usually attributed to extreme thickening of the tendons in the hip region. Snapping hip syndrome most often occurs in people who are 15 to 40 years old.

=== Extra-articular ===
Extra-articular snapping hip syndrome is commonly associated with leg length difference (usually the long side is symptomatic), tightness in the iliotibial band (ITB) on the involved side, weakness in hip abductors and external rotators, poor lumbopelvic stability and abnormal foot mechanics (overpronation). Popping during external snapping hip (lateral-extra articular), occurs when the thickened posterior aspect of the ITB or the anterior gluteus maximus rubs over the greater trochanter as the hip is extended. Internal snapping hip (medial-extra articular) is usually described by the patient as a snapping or locking of the hip with an audible snap and occurs when the iliopsoas tendon snaps over underlying bony prominences. Almost half of patients with internal snapping hip also have inter-articular pathology.

=== Intra-articular ===
The causes of intra-articular snapping hip syndrome seem to be broadly similar to those of the extra-articular type, but often include an underlying mechanical problem in the lower extremity. The pain associated with the internal variety tends to be more intense and therefore more debilitating than with the external variety. Intra-articular snapping hip syndrome is often indicative of injury such as a torn acetabular labrum, ligamentum teres tears, loose bodies, articular cartilage damage, or synovial chondromatosis (cartilage formations in the synovial membrane of the joint).

== Diagnostic ==
- Ultrasound during hip motion may visualize tendon subluxation and any accompanying bursitis when evaluating for iliopsoas involvement in medial extra-articular cases.
- MRI can sometimes identify intra-articular causes of snapping hip syndrome.

== Treatment ==
This condition is usually curable with appropriate treatment, or sometimes it heals spontaneously. If it is painless, there is little cause for concern. Correcting any contributing biomechanical abnormalities and stretching tightened muscles, such as the iliopsoas muscle or iliotibial band, is the goal of treatment to prevent recurrence.

Referral to an appropriate professional for an accurate diagnosis is necessary if self treatment is not successful or the injury is interfering with normal activities. Medical treatment of the condition requires determination of the underlying pathology and tailoring therapy to the cause. The examiner may check muscle-tendon length and strength, perform joint mobility testing, and palpate the affected hip over the greater trochanter for lateral symptoms during an activity such as walking.

=== Self-treatment ===
A self-treatment recommended by the U.S. Army for a soft tissue injury of the iliopsoas muscle treatment, like for other soft tissue injuries, is a HI-RICE (Hydration, Ibuprofen, Rest, Ice, Compression, Elevation) regimen lasting for at least 48 to 72 hours after the onset of pain. "Rest" includes such commonsense prescriptions as avoiding running or hiking (especially on hills), and avoiding exercises such as jumping jacks, sit-ups or leg lifts/flutter kicks.

Stretching of the tight structures (piriformis, hip abductor, and hip flexor muscle) may alleviate the symptoms. The involved muscle is stretched (for 30 seconds), repeated three times separated by 30 second to 1 minute rest periods, in sets performed two times daily for six to eight weeks. This should allow one to progress back into jogging until symptoms disappear.

=== Injection based treatments ===
Injections are usually focused on the iliopsoas bursa. Corticosteroid injections are common, but usually only last weeks to months. In addition, corticosteroid side effects can include weight gain, weakening of the surrounding tissues, and even osteoporosis, with regular use. Cellular based therapy may have a role in future injection based treatments, though there is no current research proving the effectiveness of these therapies.

=== Surgical treatment ===
If medicine or physical therapy is ineffective or abnormal structures are found, surgery may be recommended.

Surgical treatment is rarely necessary unless intra-articular pathology is present. In patients with persistently painful iliopsoas symptoms surgical release of the contracted iliopsoas tendon has been used since 1984. Iliopsoas and iliotibial band lengthening can be done arthroscopically. Postop, these patients will usually undergo extensive physical therapy; regaining full strength may take up to 9–12 months.

== Rehabilitation ==
Patients may require intermittent NSAID therapy or simple analgesics as they progress in activities. If persistent pain caused by bursitis continues, a corticosteroid injection may be beneficial.

=== Physical therapy and rehabilitation ===
Both active and passive stretching exercises that include hip and knee extension should be the focus of the program. Stretching the hip into extension and limiting excessive knee flexion avoids placing the rectus femoris in a position of passive insufficiency, thereby maximizing the stretch to the iliopsoas tendon. Strengthening exercises for the hip flexors may also be an appropriate component of the program. A non-steroidal anti-inflammatory drug regimen as well as activity modification or activity progression (or both) may be used. Once symptoms have decreased a maintenance program of stretching and strengthening can be initiated. Light aerobic activity (warmup) followed by stretching and strengthening of the proper hamstring, hip flexors, and iliotibial band length is important for reducing recurrences. Conservative measures may resolve the problem in six to eight weeks.

Massage or self-myofascial release may be an effective intervention for external snapping hip syndromes. It is suggested that using soft-tissue modalities to target the iliopsoas for medial extra-articulate snapping hip syndrome and gluteus maximus, tensor fasciae latae, and ITB complex for lateral extras-articulate snapping hip syndrome may be effective in treating symptoms of snapping hip syndrome.

== See also ==
- Femoral acetabular impingement
- Iliotibial band syndrome
