= Chandler's disease =

- Other names: Idiopathic avascular osteonecrosis of the femoral head
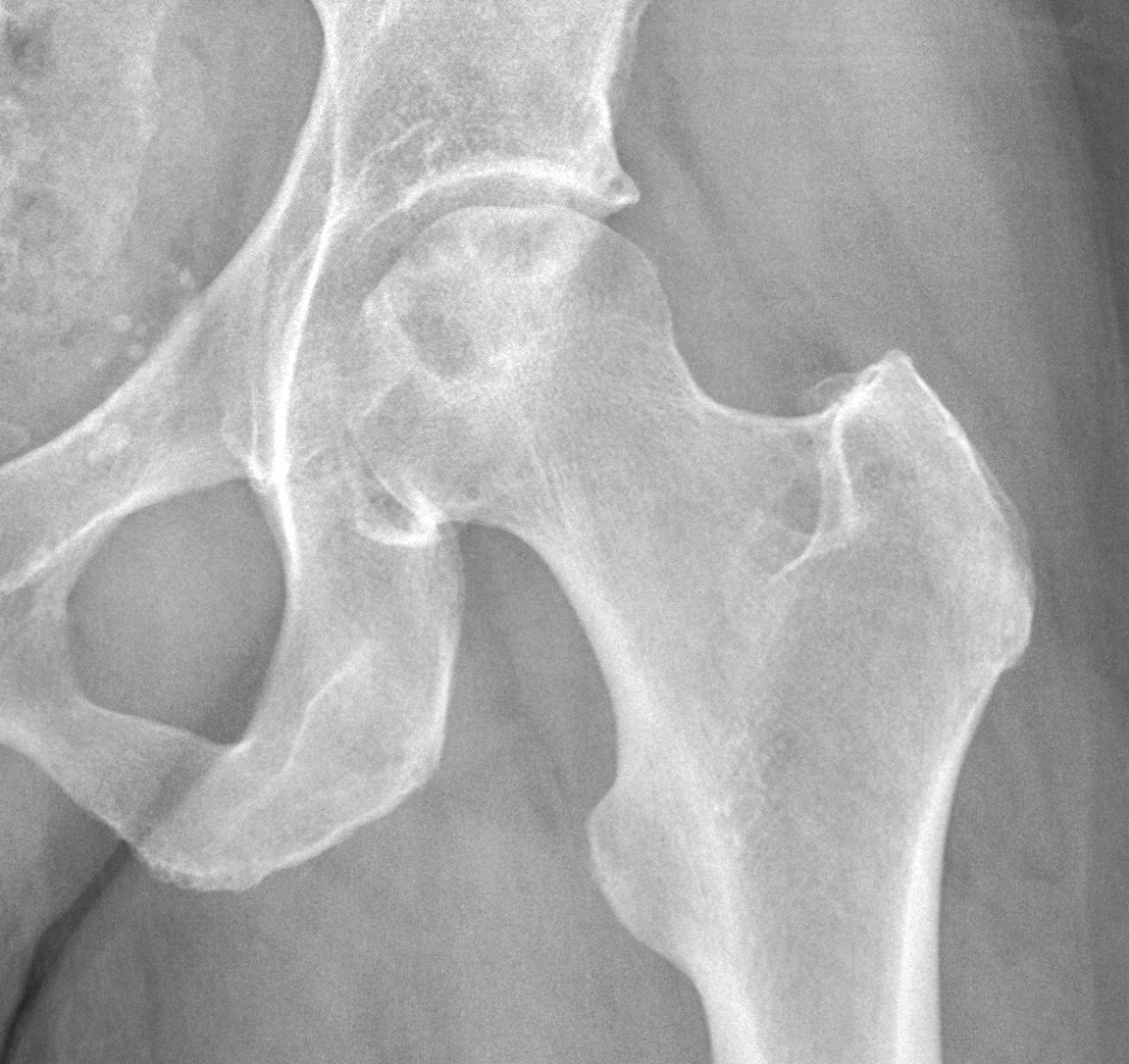
- X-ray of hip with femoral head osteonecrosis
- Specialty: Orthopedics

Chandler's disease, also known as idiopathic avascular osteonecrosis of the femoral head (ANFH or ONFH), is a rare condition in which the bone cells in the head of the femur (FH) die due to lack of blood. This disease is caused when blood flow is reduced to the part of a bone near a joint. It is specifically unique because the femoral head is for some reason the only affected part of the body and rarely travels down to the main part of the femur. In 1948, F. A. Chandler did a multi-case review and first released his interpretations as Coronary Disease of the Hip. This term is now considered incorrect as it improperly describes the actual disease.

In current practice patients usually present with hip pain on the side with Chandler's disease. Since this is such a rare diagnosis some more conservative pain control methods are seldom used first before in-depth scans are used that lead to the diagnosis. Based on the staging of the dying bone typically dictates the course of treatment. Many of the more conservative treatments do lead to a whole hip replacement in the span of the patient's lifetime but there is promise of saving the dying bone or proper healing if caught early enough. At this time there are little research on curing the disease since it is not directly life-threatening and even the most invasive options lead to a moderate quality of life. Most of the research is more focused on finding if there is a combination of conservative treatments that together can replace more invasive treatment options as the preferred method of treatment in the later stages.

== Signs and symptoms ==
Clinical presentation of Chandlers or ANFH typically is asymptomatic in the early stages. As the condition progresses on patients may develop groin pain that can radiate to the knee and/or ipsilateral buttock otherwise known as the buttock on the same side of the body. In the most severe untreated cases the patient may not be able to walk, stand, or sit due to the increased exposure of nerves to the dead parts of the bone. On physical examination, patients usually present with a limited range of motion at the hip and complain of pain particularly with forced internal rotation. Many people will not know they have it until further diagnostic scans. Those who have it will get diagnosed unless it spontaneously heals on its own which is uncommon. Patients usually go through a few rounds of treatment and testing before more in depth scans are ordered and a full diagnosis is made. Either that or a repeat scan can show degeneration prompting for more in depth investigation. The signs and symptoms of this condition are so similar to others that the more common conditions are treated for or ruled out first.

== Etiology and pathogenesis ==
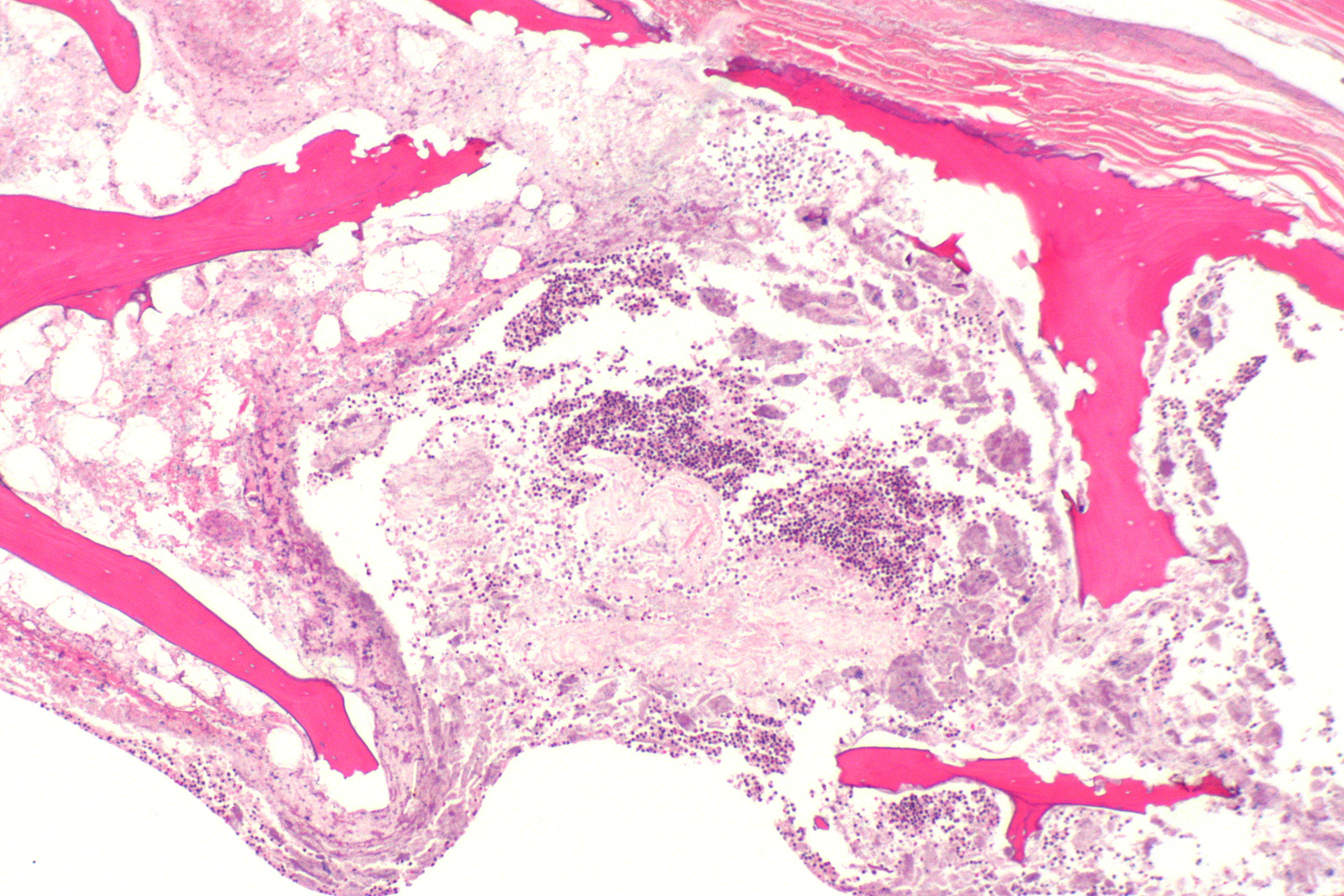
Necrotic bone and inflammation histology slide

The current etiology or origin of this disease is unknown. Some studies theorized that bone remodeling is maintained in a microenvironment in the FH meaning that there is a greater local component to changes to the femoral head than the normal systemic way that bone remodeling is handled throughout the body. As a whole our body goes through bone remodeling using various hormones and glucocorticoids to balance the uptake and output of bone throughout the entire body. The local portion is considered to be controlled partially by inflammatory cells called cytokines and individual growth factors. The theory is that the local bone remodeling is malfunctioning and overpowering the systemic bone remodeling causing the FH to be highly susceptible to necrosis. Studies have determined that there are risk factors that are more than likely associated with the development of the disease but many of them are very broad and include large groups of people for example alcoholics, diabetics, and many other common core morbidities. Unfortunately, most are classified under idiopathic due to being unable to truly narrow down the origin of why it only happens to the head of the femur. What most clinicians observe is that the head of the femur seems to almost have a system of its own somewhat separate from the rest of the femur. There are many theories as to how the head of the femur dies unlike why it is happening.

=== Non-traumatic mechanisms ===
The main mechanism is through external factors causing micro-emboli in the vessels leading to occlusions to the vessels or anyway that can cause ischemia to the femoral head. External factors that can cause these emboli can include alcohol, lipid circulation, high doses of glucocorticoids, and new increases in bone marrow fat cells. Vascular occlusion can also be caused by disease progressions that increase coagulation and thrombus formation in the vessels. Clotting disorders and red blood cell disorders can also lead to abnormal vessel occlusions. Very rarely seen though is a cause of ischemia from decompression sickness or coming down from high pressured areas too fast causing a gaseous bubble to block blood flow. In an extremely rare case, the patient reports to have a familial trait of developing this condition. Although genetic factors play a role in how ANFH can develop the genes themselves do not tend to be the cause. In this case from Japan the family had a specific autosomal dominant mutation that led to failure of collagen type II and thus led to low bone stability and ANFH. Although this does highlight a specific cause in this case, we are still unsure how or why it contains itself solely to the femoral head.

=== Traumatic ===
Trauma can be classified as a fracture or dislocation of the FH. This can lead to damage to the extraosseous or outer bone blood supply. This is especially prevalent to fractures in the junction between the FH and the neck of the femur called the sub capital region. Trauma at the sub capital region interrupts the connection or anastomosis between the outer blood vessels on the end of the bone or lateral epiphyseal vessels causing poor blood flow to the FH. Lastly, direct irradiation, chemotherapy, or oxidative stress may lead to cellular malfunction ultimately leading to cellular death.

== Diagnosis ==
ANFH can only be diagnosed by MRI of the hip and X-rays of the hip specifically in the anteroposterior and frog-leg lateral poses. Along with these scans an additional bone scan needs to be done which allows doctors to see the activities of bone cells in a body. Once the images that the physician want are obtained, they are then measured through two systematic reviews.

Ficat and Arlet classification system consists of four stages, based on standard radiographs

Ficat and Arlet classification system
Staging	Requirements
Stage 0	Normal x-ray and MRI with no symptoms
Stage I	Minor osteopenia on the x-ray, edema on the MRI, and increased bone uptake on the bone scan
Stage II	On x-ray and MRI there is normal FH contour, but with evidence of bone-remodeling, and sclerotic and cystic changes. Bone scan would still show increased uptake.
Stage III	X-ray and MRI indicates evidence of subchondral collapse, crescent sign, or flattening of the FH
Stage IV	MRI and X -ray show narrowing of the joint space with secondary degenerative changes in the acetabulum, which is the socket portion of the hip that is a part of the pelvis, such as cysts, osteophytes, and cartilage destruction.

Steinberg Classification System expands the Ficat system into six stages and includes quantification of involvement of the FH within each stage.

Steinberg Classification System
Staging	Sub Staging	Requirements
Stage 0	Normal x-ray and MRI with no symptoms	
Stage I	Normal X-Ray but abnormal MRI and/ or Bone Scan	
Stage I	Stage IA	< 15% of FH being involved in abnormal scan considered mild
Stage I	Stage IB	15% to 30% of FH being involved in abnormal scan considered moderate
Stage I	Stage IC	30% of FH being involved in abnormal scan considered severe
Stage II	X rays and/or MRI show a mix of osteopenia and/or sclerosis and/or subchondral cysts, without any subchondral lucency	
Stage II	Stage IIA	< 15% of FH being involved in abnormal scan considered mild
Stage II	Stage IIB	15% to 30% of FH being involved in abnormal scan considered moderate
Stage II	Stage IIC	> 30% of FH being involved in abnormal scan considered severe
Stage III	X ray and/or MRI show crescent sign	
Stage III	Stage IIIA	Mild, Subchondral collapse beneath the FH < 15%
Stage III	Stage IIIB	Moderate, Subchondral collapse beneath the FH 15% to 30%
Stage III	Stage IIIC	Severe, Subchondral collapse beneath the FH > 30%
Stage IV	X ray and MRI showing flattening of the FH	
Stage IV	Stage IVA	Mild < 15% of FH flattening
Stage IV	Stage IVB	moderate 15% to 30% of FH flattening
Stage IV	Stage IVC	Severe > 30% of FH flattening
Stage V	Joint space narrowing	
Stage V	Stage VA	Mild < 15% of narrowing
Stage V	Stage VB	moderate 15% to 30% narrowing
Stage V	Stage VC	Severe > 30% of narrowing

In addition, the Association Research Circulation Osseous (ARCO) suggested a new classification system based on the combination of radiographic, MRI, bone scan and histologic findings. However, apparently these two classifications systems, Ficat and ARCO are still not enough reliable to assess the status of ONFH alone.

== Epidemiology ==
ONFH is newly diagnosed 10 to 20 thousand times a year in the US. It is most common in individuals between the ages of 20 and 50 this is roughly what many studies tend to agree upon. Due to being such a rare occurrence and rarely study many studies come with different numbers. Many studies are on populations in Japan, the United States, and other nations. The male to female diagnosis ratio is respectively 5:1 to 2.1:1, meaning it is 2-5 times as likely to happen to a man rather than a woman. Some found a large correlation between those who smoked and contracting later stage ONFH. One study found that of their participants above 30% had an alcohol related risk factor that they believed played a possible factor into the development of the necrosis. Although these statistics can be alarming most of this is done with in the community that has ANFH. It seems to not differ between races or that it is infectious between people. When compared to national and global population this disease effects a minuscule number of people in the world. A great number of people affected by this tend to be sick or already have health problems and the percentage that have it due to hereditary reasons is extremely minuscule compared to all populations.

== Analogous diseases ==
Although Chandler's Disease is specific to the head of the femur there are many other diseases that are analogous to the mechanism of Chandler's Disease:

- Legg-Calve-Perthes syndrome is found only in children and affects the femoral head similarly as in Chandler's disease.
- Preiser Disease is generally the same problem but found in the scaphoid bone of the hand.
- Khöler Disease affects the navicular bone of the foot.
- Keinböck's disease is another disease affecting the hand but rather the lunate bone

== Treatment ==
=== Non-surgical ===
Conservative treatment of ANFH, which is considered to be non-surgical, may be effective in the earlier stages of the disease and when combined together with other types of treatments outcomes were seen to increase than treatments on their own.

Pharmacological management of AVN
Medicine type	Use	Example
lipid lowering agents	Clear out any lipids blocking vessels	Statins
anticoagulants	Stops the formation of clots	Enozaparin
vasoactive substances	Makes blood vessels wider improving blood flow	Prostacyclin
bisphosphonates	In bone remodeling it reduces osteoclast activity	

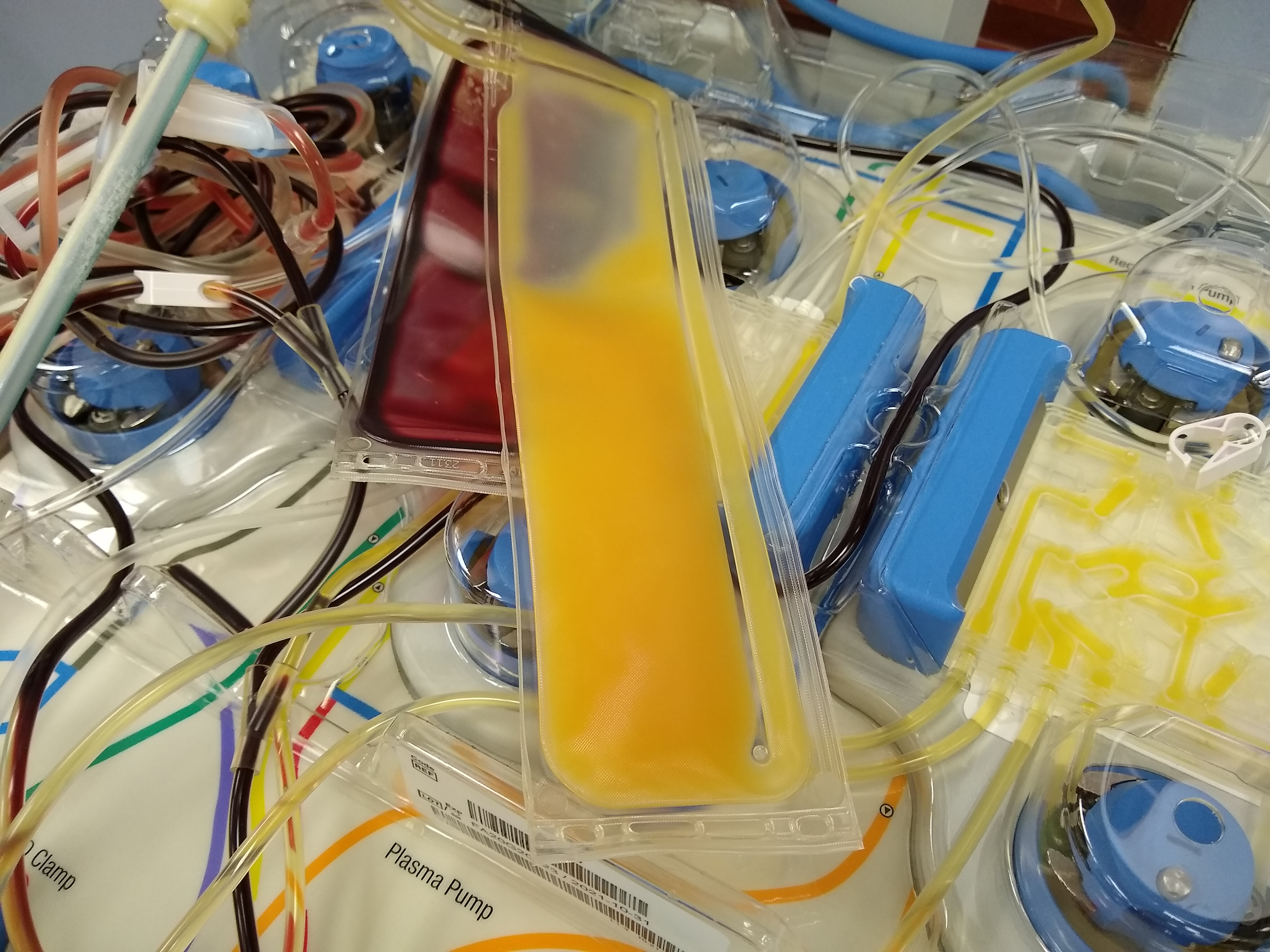
Platelets post collection

==== Platelet-rich plasma ====
Platelet-rich plasma (PRP) has eight times the number of platelets when compared with whole blood, along with high levels of regenerative proteins, growth factors. PRP helps with the start of angiogenesis and osteogenesis respectively bloodlessly formation and bone formation which is important for proper healing. PRP has the ability to stop the inflammatory response around the necrotic parts of the bone to increase patient comfort and decrease pain. PRP can help prevent glucocorticoid induced apoptosis or cell death. In fact it can reverse the bad effects of the glucocorticoids so much it actually makes them aid in osteogenesis and autophagy of the necrotic tissue which is respectively growing new bone and having the body's immune system eat and dispose of dying or dead tissue. This is one of the more thoroughly studied alternative treatments compared to others.

==== Stem cells ====
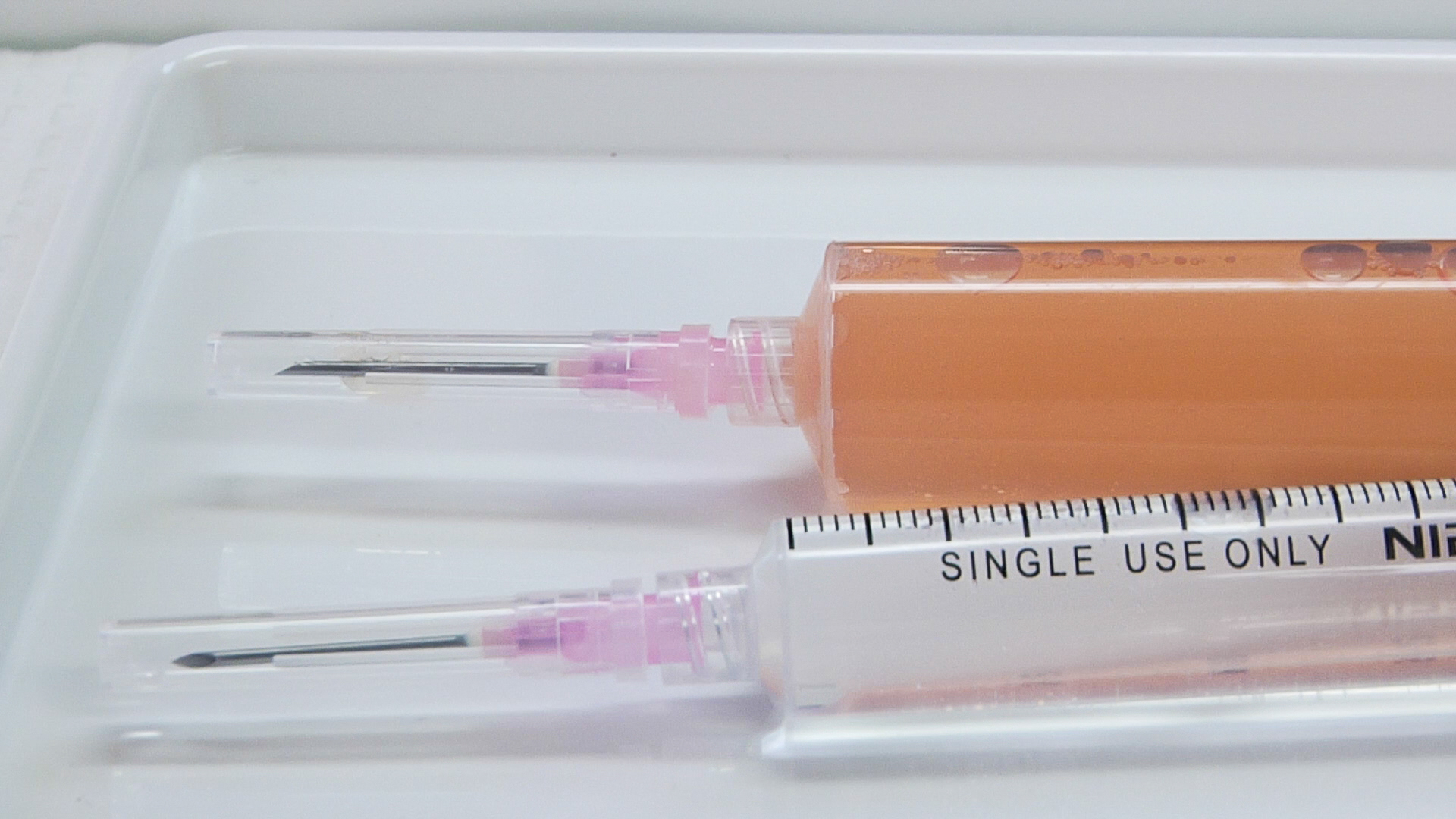
Stem cells in a syringe

==== Bone marrow ====
Bone marrow cells aid in angiogenesis (blood vessel formation). A stem cell transplants have shown some success and can be an experimental option for patients when combined with other treatments. Preliminary results are not definitive yet due to small sample sizes but the preliminary data are pointing to a possible positive correlation and outcome. There are many challenges that come with bone marrow transplants so further research is needed.

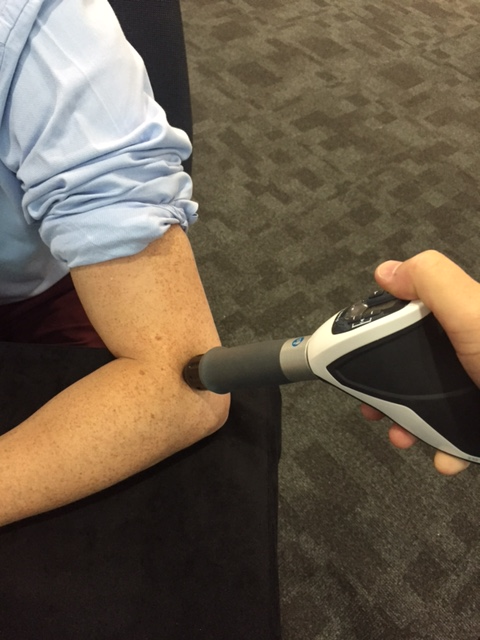
EWST of the arm

==== Extracorporeal shockwaves ====
Extracorporeal shockwave therapy (ESWT) sends sound waves through soft tissue and bone causing microbreaking. It helps break up scar tissue and other nonhealthy tissue allowing for increased repair to the area. ESWT has been shown to restore tissue oxygenation, reduce edema or fluid build up, and induce angiogenesis.

==== Pulsed electromagnetic field ====
Pulsed electromagnetic field therapy (PEMF) therapy uses pulsating electromagnetic fields to help promote ion movement and reduction of free radicals. Along with this it is theorized that the magnetic fields help "communicate with the body" to increase and improve body functions such as healing. There have been numerous studious on this therapy since it is relatively new. The results are promising but nothing is definitive and is still experimental at the moment. In orthopedics PEMF is used to stimulate osteogenesis and angiogenesis.

==== Hyperbaric oxygen ====
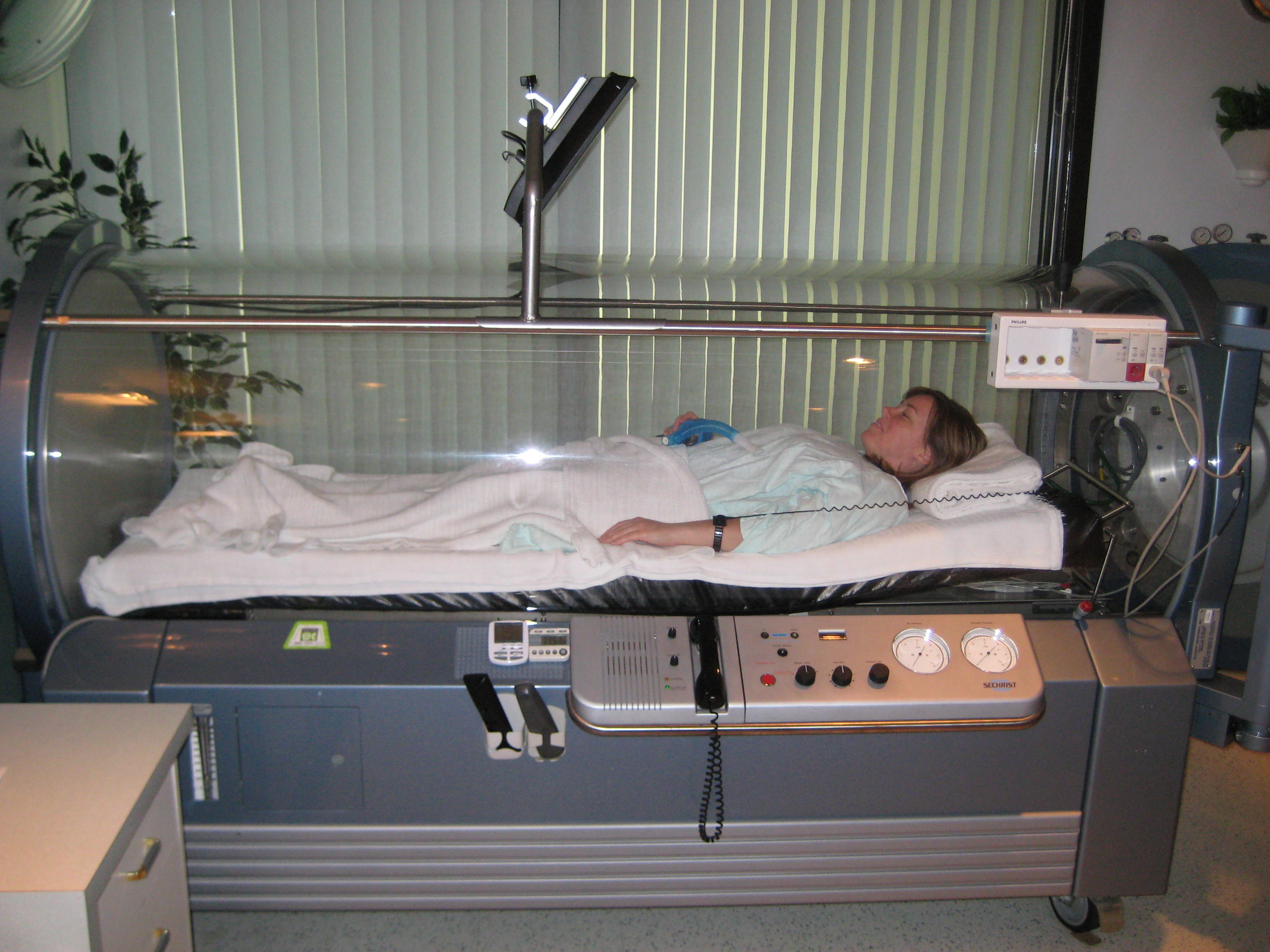
Hyper baric Oxygen Chamber in 2008

Hyperbaric oxygen (HBO) therapy works by filling a sealed container with 100% oxygen and increasing the pressure in the chamber to a safe amount. The pressure basically causes and imbalance of partial oxygen pressure in your blood increasing cellular and plasma uptake of blood. This extra oxygen in the body due to the therapy increases extracellular oxygen concentration and reduces cellular ischemia and edema by inducing vasoconstriction. This therapy is expensive and not easily available. On its own it in a limited setting it has limited effectiveness but with a combination of treatments and proper frequency can help increase healing and prognosis.

Weightbearing restriction alone is not a sufficient treatment in preventing progression of the condition but when combined with the therapies above it can improve case success rate.

=== Surgical ===
American Association of Hip and Knee Surgeons found that total hip arthroplasty was the most used treatment of post-collapse stages of ONFH, whereas core decompression was the most used treatment for pre-collapse stages of ONFH

==== Core decompression ====
Core decompression (CD) of the FH is the standard procedure for early stages of ONFH. The surgery aims to reduce the pressure in the FH capsule. In order to do this the surgeon drills holes into the necrotic bone of the FH to promote bleeding and healing in the FH while decreasing the pressure due to inflammation. A combination of CD of the FH and other non-surgical treatments have shown the best results for CD outcomes.

==== Femoral head sparing procedure ====
Femoral Head Sparing Procedure (FHSP) is aimed to try and save the patients femoral head instead of removing all the bone. This procedure includes core decompression (CD) combined with different types of bone grafting and/or less invasive combination treatments . Due to the necrotic bone destroying the original spherical shape of the FH this treatment is to spare as much bone as possible to hopefully avoid complete replacement of the joint.

==== Arthroplasty ====
Hemi-resurfacing arthroplasty: This is used only when the necrotic tissue has not affected the joint surfaces and the cartilage is minimally damaged. This allows the surgeon to shave down the FH inducing growth but keeping the same overall shape of the FH

==== Bone grafting ====
Non-vascularized bone grafts are used from many different sources to fill in the areas where dead bone were in the FH. Many times it is done using the holes made when CD is done which is the most common way to do it. Other ways to do it is to make a separate surgical window to the FH or to go through the neck of the femur. The disadvantage to this is that during the procedure the patients hip needs to be dislocated which can cause problems afterwards. The bone graft can help prevent osteoarthritis by helping restore some of the shape of the femoral head. When vascularized bone graft is used though it helps increase more than other types since the grafts themselves already have prebuilt vessels and the body can form new ones off of those.

==== Tantalum implants ====
Tantalum implants are used with CD and since they are porous they offer great structural support for the bone to grow into. These are best useful when bone graft causes too much risk but CD is too unstable on its own.

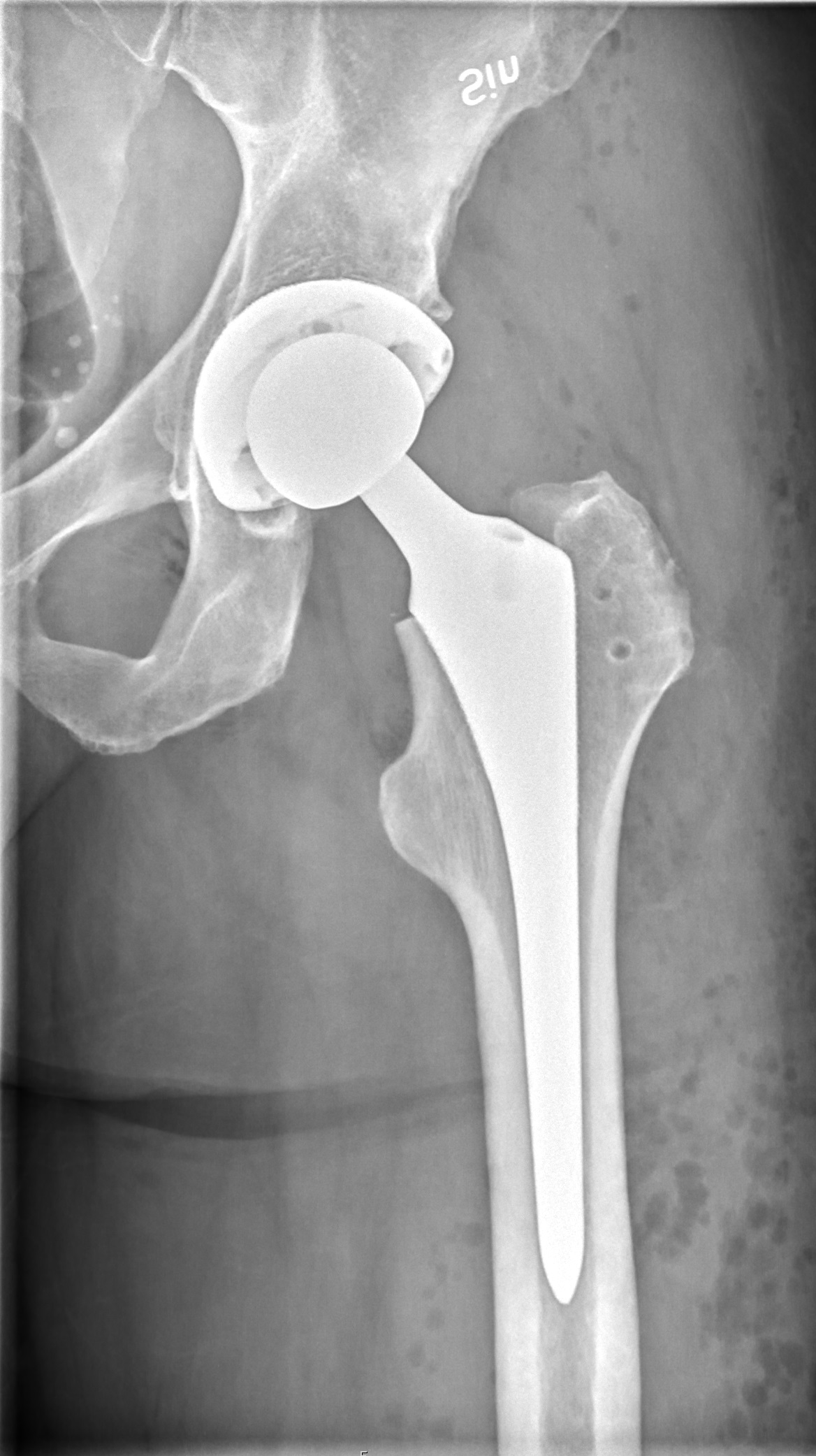
Left hip total arthroplasty

==== Hip replacement ====
When patients have later stages of ONFH most other treatment options are not successful or even worth trying. Thus the only option is total hip replacement where the FH and the pelvic portion of the joint are both replaced, or one part of the hip joint is replaced. Many surgeons do choose to just replace the hip altogether in some mild cases because hip replacements have a longer success rate and most of the time if you try to do partial replacements or FH sparing techniques that are not totally successful: later in life a hip replacement is needed. A lot is needed to take into consideration including age and progression.

== Prognosis ==
Several studies have shown that the size of the necrotic segment in the FH is a fundamental parameter to determine the prognosis and treatment of this condition. The greater the amount of necrotic bone the poorer the prognosis for minimal treatment outcomes. The disease on its own will not lead to death but completely untreated the disease may lead to other more problematic conditions such as sepsis which again if left untreated will lead to death. Beyond this caveat majority of prognosis is based on severity of the disease prior or treatment and which treatment option is chosen. Due to the rarity of the disease there a little to know review studies so there are no agreed upon study that sums up all treatment options and their outcomes. It is extremally hard to find studies that isolate certain treatment plans or studies that compare it to others. Many of the Non-surgical treatments were found to delay progression but no data about reversing the necrosis along with this surgical treatments were shown to immediately fix the necrosis but failure was defined in most as needing to continue with more invasive surgery or replacing the hip in THA .

=== Treatments and prognosis ===
==== Non-surgical options ====
The non-surgical treatments and associated outcomes can be summarized to:

- In a limited study 53% who were treated with anticoagulants found that it helped patients from progressing from Stage I to Stage II
- Experimental Stem cell therapy found that at various stages when injected into the hip the time to collapse was delayed 35% more than without it
- Those that chose to only use weightbearing limitations saw a 90% failure rate and lead to continuation of the necrosis
- In a 10 year study of ESWT saw a lack of progression in all Stage I, 64% of stage II and 12% of Stage III patients
- PEMF study of 28 months showed improvement in stage I and II at 94% but stage III failed completely

==== Surgical options ====
Prognoses for a range of surgical interventions is as follows:

- Core Depression and PRP therapy at the 5 year check up showed a 100% success rate for stage I, 67% for stage IIa and 0% for Stage IIb, and of these 68% were idiopathic and 32% secondary osteonecrosis to other procedures or diseases. This data was pulled from a limited control study and the sample size was very small but this does show promising results
- THA on any staged hip has an 87% success rate at 10 year check up
- Tantalum implants paired with CD at various stages saw a 91% success rate at 2 year follow up and 68% success at 4 year follow up
- Vascularized bone graft at various stages found just above 30% improvement in radiographical changes with above 50% no change and increased necrosis in 9%
- Those categorized as stage II only 5-15% get total hip replacement

== Research ==
Although research is very seldom on the cause of the disease, most is directed to what the best treatment combinations. Many researchers have concluded that single conservative treatment is basically ineffective. What is interesting is many researchers agree that a combination of conservative treatments or even a combination of minimally invasive and conservative treatments can be just as good as the typical treatment. This is only in moderate cases most severe cases can only be treated with the more invasive treatment methods.

One technique that is mentioned and being further studied is bone grafting. Although traditional bone grafting is receiving well remarks others that use cartilage transplant as well are indicating that the extra cartilage which is well needed might be causing slower progression since it is more delicate. Unfortunately the research was limited and is further being researched.

Deeper into Stem cell therapy is multipotent cell introduction. The multipotent cell is a less specified bone stem cell and the theory is that the cells can turn into not only bone but other tissue cell types that will increase the repair of the femoral head as a whole when used alongside vascularized bone grafts. This studied was very limited and results were not as definitive but the preliminary data may lead to promising results in a larger study.
