= Preiser =

Preiser may refer to:

- Preiser disease, also known as (idiopathic) avascular necrosis of the scaphoid.
- Peter Preiser, professor of molecular genetics and cell biology at the Nanyang Technological University.
- Graziela Preiser, pattern and textile designer known in Germany for her 1970s designs.
