= Four corner fusion =

- Other names: Partial wrist arthrodesis
- Specialty: Orthopedic

Four corner fusion, or partial wrist arthrodesis, is a procedure which involves resection/removal of the scaphoid bone and fixation of the remaining wrist bones with a plate or wires. The procedure is usually performed due to wrist arthritis or due to scaphoid collapse. This surgical intervention is often needed as treatment for patients with wrist osteoarthritis.

== See also ==
- Preiser disease
