= Crescent sign (bone) =

Pattern seen in radiologic examinations

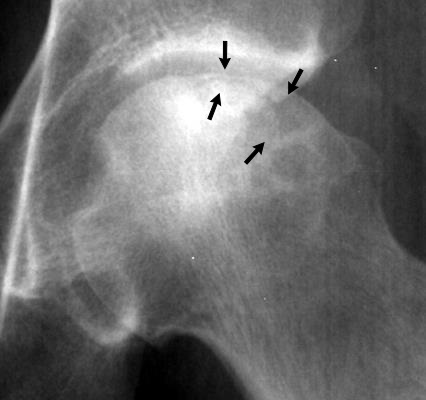
A radiograph of a left hip joint, which reveals a thin, curvilinear lucent line parallel to the cortical margin of the femoral head, in a patient with avascular necrosis.

In radiology, the crescent sign is a finding on conventional radiographs that is associated with avascular necrosis. It usually occurs later in the disease, in stage III of the four-stage Ficat classification system. It appears as a curved subchondral radiolucent line that is often found on the proximal femoral or humeral head. Usually, this sign indicates a high likelihood of collapse of the affected bone. The crescent sign may be best seen in an abducted (frog-legged) position.

The crescent sign is caused by the necrotic and repair processes that occur during avascular necrosis. Osteosclerosis occurs at a margin where new bone is placed over dead trabeculae. When the trabeculae experience stress leading to microfractures and collapse, the crescent sign appears.

The crescent sign may be seen with other bone diseases, such as shear fractures.
