= Peter Preiser =

Professor in Singapore

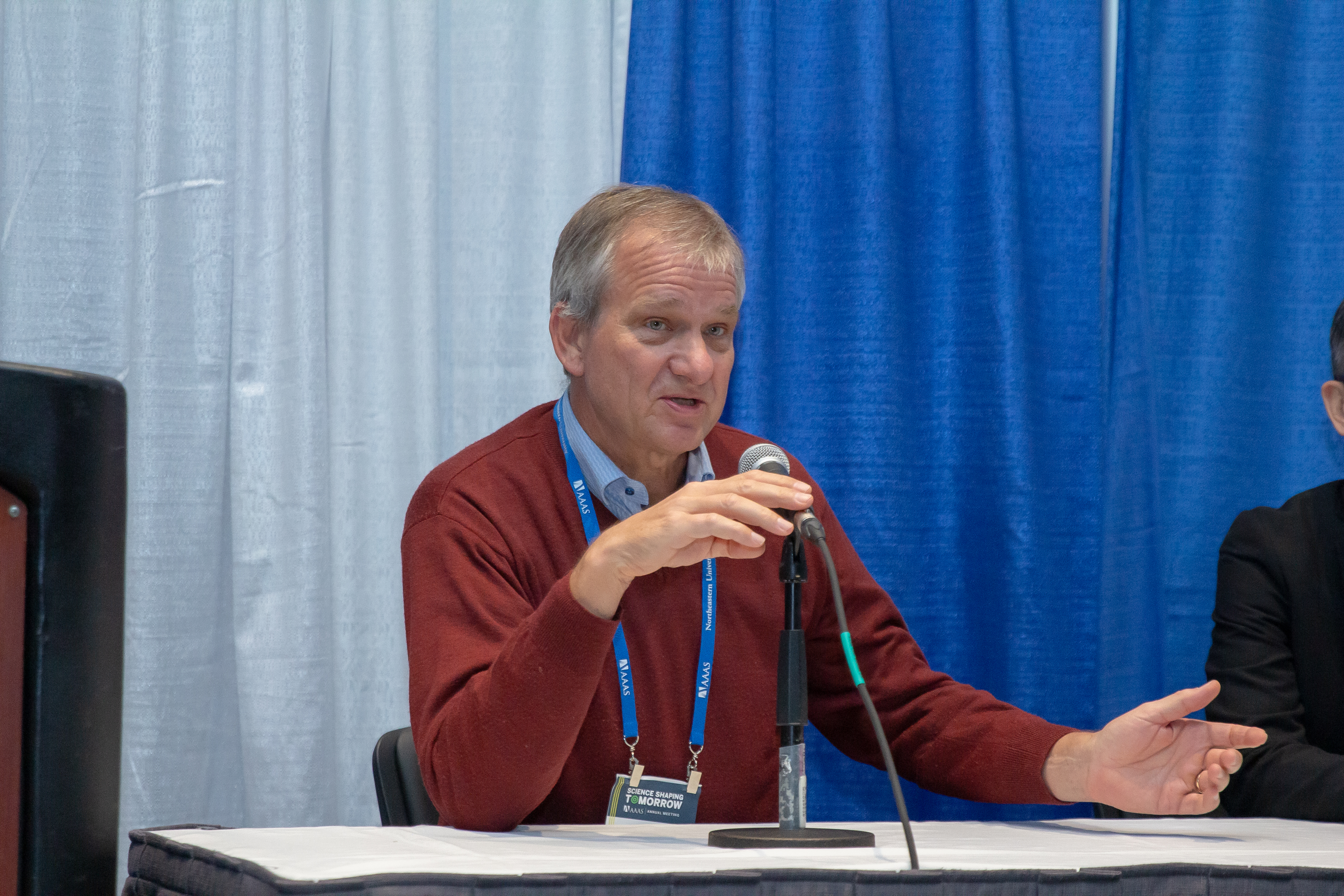
Preiser in 2025

Peter Preiser is chair of the School of Biological Sciences and a professor of molecular genetics and cell biology at the Nanyang Technological University (NTU) in Singapore. He specialises in the study of the malaria parasite and is head of the team at NTU that has discovered a route to a possible vaccine for the disease.
