= Avascular necrosis =

Death of bone tissue due to interruption of the blood supply

- Other names: Osteonecrosis, bone infarction, aseptic necrosis, ischemic bone necrosis
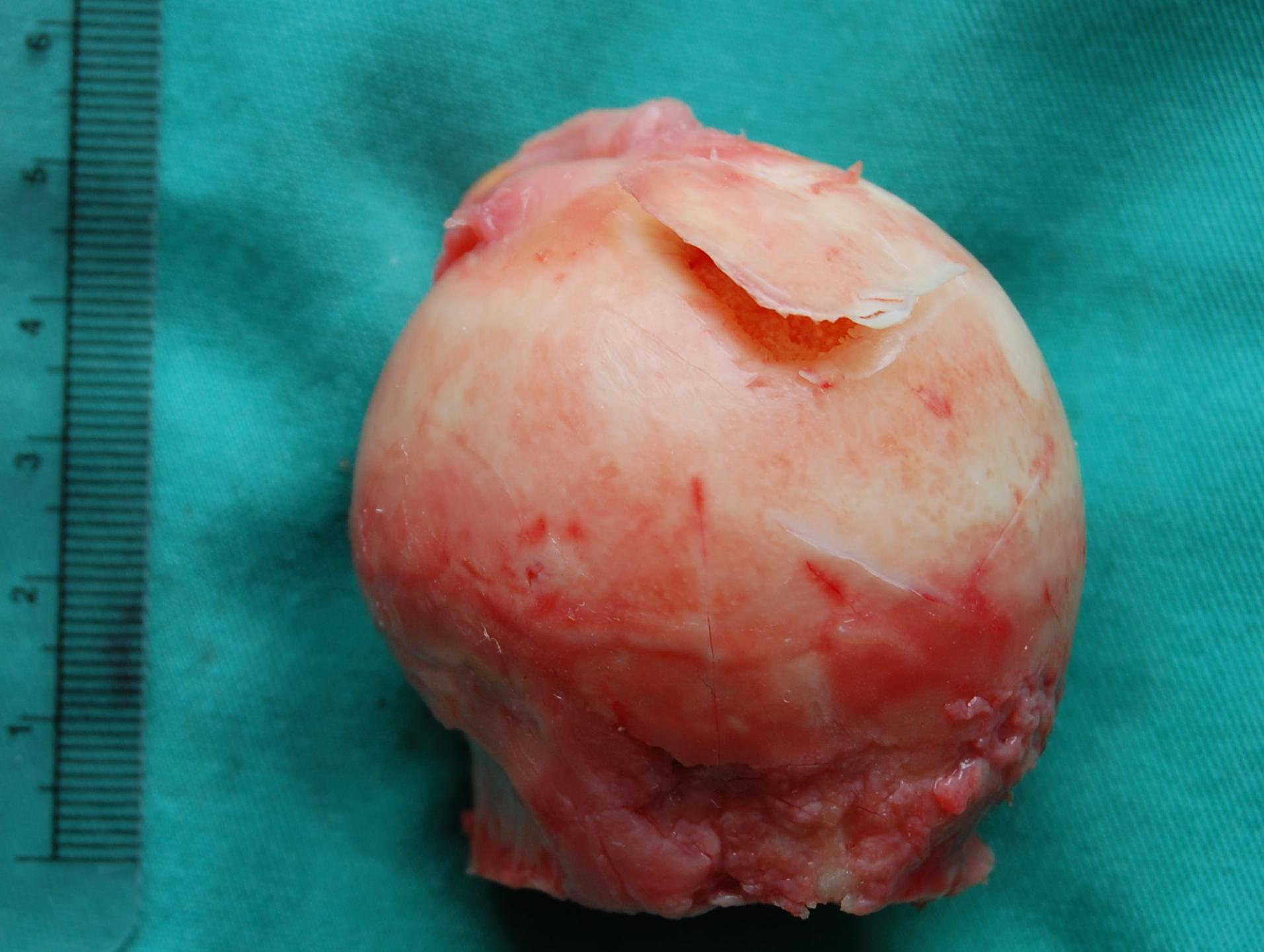
- Femoral head showing a flap of cartilage due to avascular necrosis (osteochondritis dissecans). Specimen removed during total hip replacement surgery.
- Specialty: Orthopedics
- Symptoms: Joint pain, decreased ability to move
- Complications: Osteoarthritis
- Usual onset: Gradual
- Risk factors: Bone fractures, joint dislocations, high dose steroids
- Diagnostic method: Medical imaging, biopsy
- Differential diagnosis: Osteopetrosis, rheumatoid arthritis, Legg–Calvé–Perthes syndrome, sickle cell disease
- Treatment: Medication, not walking on the affected leg, stretching, surgery
- Frequency: ~15,000 per year (US)

Avascular necrosis (AVN), also called osteonecrosis or bone infarction, is death of bone tissue due to interruption of the blood supply. Early on, there may be no symptoms. Gradually joint pain may develop, which may limit the person's ability to move. Complications may include collapse of the bone or nearby joint surface.

Risk factors include bone fractures, joint dislocations, alcoholism, and the use of high-dose steroids. The condition may also occur without any clear reason. The most commonly affected bone is the femur (thigh bone). Other relatively common sites include the upper arm bone, knee, shoulder, and ankle. Diagnosis is typically by medical imaging such as X-ray, CT scan, or MRI. Rarely biopsy may be used.

Treatments may include medication, not loading the affected bone, stretching, and surgery. Most of the time surgery is eventually required and may include core decompression, osteotomy, bone grafts, or joint replacement.

About 15,000 cases occur per year in the United States. People 30 to 50 years old are most commonly affected. Males are more commonly affected than females.

== Signs and symptoms ==
In many cases, there is pain and discomfort in a joint which increases over time. It can affect any bone, and in about half of affected people, multiple sites are damaged.

Avascular necrosis most commonly affects the ends of long bones, such as the femur. Other common sites include the humerus (upper arm), knees, shoulders, ankles and the jaw.

== Causes ==
The main risk factors are bone fractures, joint dislocations, alcoholism, and the use of high-dose steroids. Other risk factors include radiation therapy, chemotherapy, and organ transplantation. Osteonecrosis is also associated with cancer, lupus, sickle cell disease, HIV infection, Gaucher's disease, and Caisson disease (dysbaric osteonecrosis). Bisphosphonates are associated with osteonecrosis of the mandible (jawbone). The condition may also occur without any clear reason.

Prolonged, repeated exposure to high pressures (as experienced by commercial and military divers) has been linked to AVN, though the relationship is not well understood.

In children, avascular osteonecrosis can have several causes. It can occur in the hip as part of Legg–Calvé–Perthes syndrome, and it can also occur as a result after malignancy treatment such as acute lymphoblastic leukemia and allotransplantation.

== Pathophysiology ==
The hematopoietic cells are most sensitive to low oxygen and are the first to die after reduction or removal of the blood supply, usually within 12 hours. Experimental evidence suggests that bone cells (osteocytes, osteoclasts, osteoblasts etc.) die within 12–48 hours, and that bone marrow fat cells die within 5 days.

Upon reperfusion, repair of bone occurs in two phases. First, there is angiogenesis and movement of undifferentiated mesenchymal cells from adjacent living bone tissue grow into the dead marrow spaces, as well as entry of macrophages that degrade dead cellular and fat debris. Second, there is cellular differentiation of mesenchymal cells into osteoblasts or fibroblasts. Under favorable conditions, the remaining inorganic mineral volume forms a framework for establishment of new, fully functional bone tissue.

== Diagnosis ==
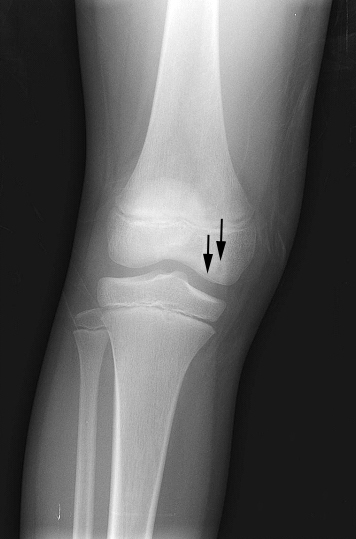
Front X-ray of right knee of an adolescent (epiphyseal plates are open): arrows point to avascular necrosis and developing osteochondritis dissecans in the outer medial condyle of femur

In the early stages, bone scintigraphy and MRI are the preferred diagnostic tools.

X-ray images of avascular necrosis in the early stages usually appear normal. In later stages it appears relatively more radio-opaque due to the nearby living bone becoming resorbed secondary to reactive hyperemia. The necrotic bone itself does not show increased radiographic opacity, as dead bone cannot undergo bone resorption which is carried out by living osteoclasts. Late radiographic signs also include a radiolucency area following the collapse of subchondral bone (crescent sign) and ringed regions of radiodensity resulting from saponification and calcification of marrow fat following medullary infarcts.

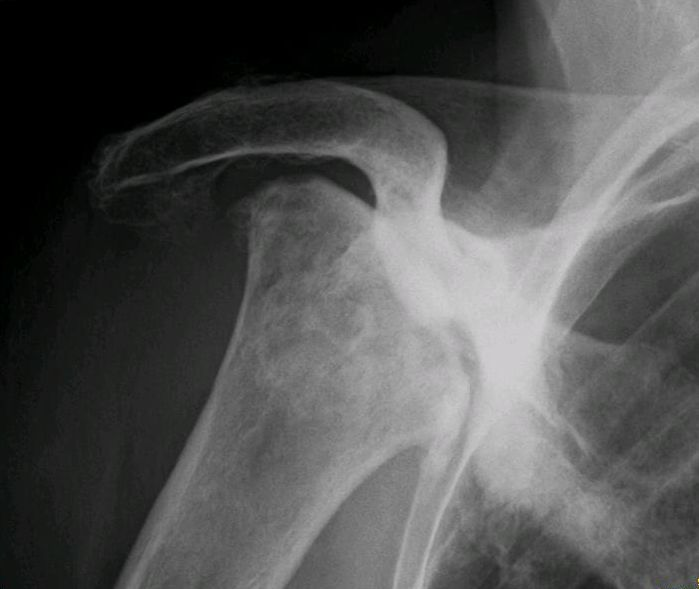
Radiography of total avascular necrosis of right humeral head. Woman of 81 years with diabetes of long evolution.

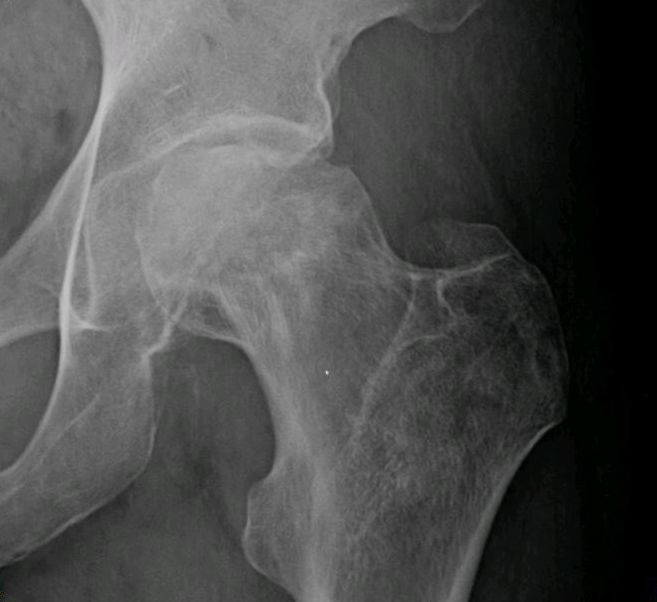
Radiography of avascular necrosis of left femoral head. Man of 45 years with AIDS.

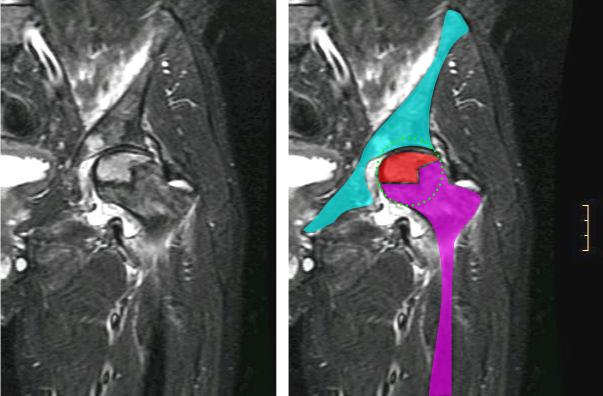
Nuclear magnetic resonance of avascular necrosis of left femoral head. Man of 45 years with AIDS.

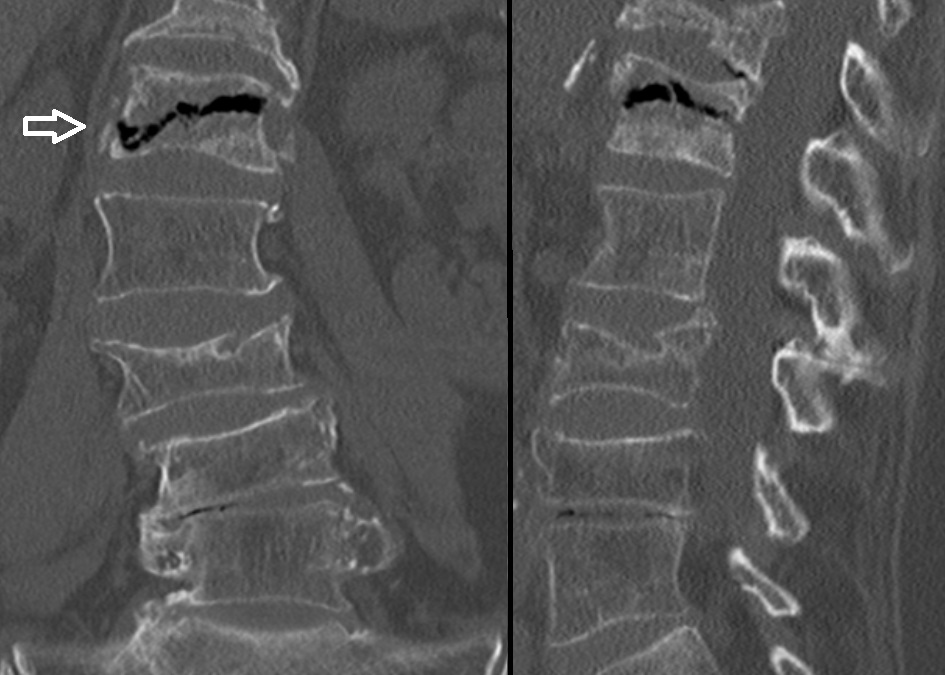
The intravertebral vacuum cleft sign (at white arrow) is a sign of avascular necrosis. Avascular necrosis of a vertebral body after a vertebral compression fracture is called Kümmel's disease.

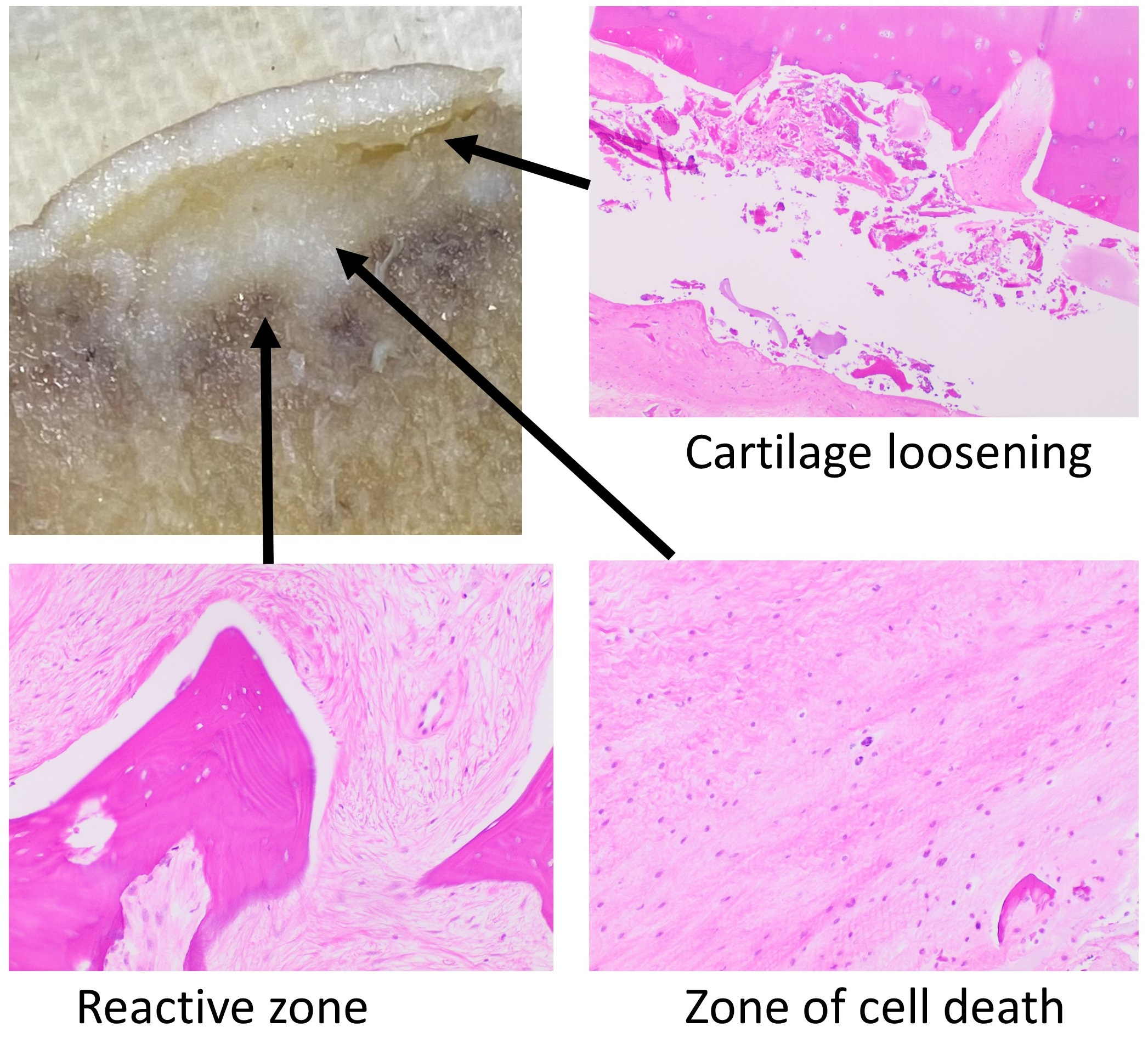
Pathology of avascular necrosis, with a photograph of a cross-section of the involved bone at top left. The reactive zone shows irregular trebaculae with empty lacunae, and fibrosis of the marrow space.

=== Types ===
When AVN affects the scaphoid bone, it is known as Preiser disease. Another named form of AVN is Köhler disease, which affects the navicular bone of the foot, primarily in children. Yet another form of AVN is Kienböck's disease, which affects the lunate bone in the wrist.

== Treatment ==
A variety of methods may be used to treat the disease, with the most common being total hip replacement (THR). However, THRs have a number of downsides, including long recovery times and the lifespans of the hip joints (often around 20 to 30 years). THRs are an effective means of treatment in the older population; however, in younger people, they may wear out before the end of a person's life.

Other techniques, such as metal-on-metal resurfacing, may not be suitable in all cases of avascular necrosis; its suitability depends on how much damage has occurred to the femoral head. Bisphosphonates, which reduce the rate of bone breakdown, may prevent collapse (specifically of the hip) due to AVN.

=== Core decompression ===
Other treatments include core decompression, whereby internal bone pressure is relieved by drilling a hole into the bone, and a living bone chip and an electrical device to stimulate new vascular growth are implanted; and the free vascular fibular graft (FVFG), in which a portion of the fibula, along with its blood supply, is removed and transplanted into the femoral head. A 2016 Cochrane review found no clear improvement between people who have had hip core decompression and participate in physical therapy, versus physical therapy alone. There is additionally no strong research on the effectiveness of hip core decompression for people with sickle cell disease.

The disease's progression may be halted by transplanting nucleated cells from the bone marrow into avascular necrosis lesions after core decompression. However, much further research is needed to establish this technique.

== Prognosis ==
The amount of disability that results from avascular necrosis depends on what part of the bone is affected, how large an area is involved, and how effectively the bone rebuilds itself. The process of bone rebuilding takes place after an injury as well as during normal growth. Normally, bone continuously breaks down and rebuilds—old bone is resorbed and replaced with new bone. The process keeps the skeleton strong and helps it to maintain a balance of minerals. In the course of avascular necrosis, however, the healing process is usually ineffective and the bone tissues break down faster than the body can repair them. If left untreated, the disease progresses, the bone collapses, and the joint surface breaks down, leading to pain and arthritis.

== Epidemiology ==
Avascular necrosis usually affects people between 30 and 50 years of age; about 10,000 to 20,000 people develop avascular necrosis of the head of the femur in the US each year.

== Society and culture ==
Cases of avascular necrosis have been identified in a few high-profile athletes. It abruptly ended the career of American football running-back Bo Jackson in 1991. Doctors discovered Jackson to have lost all of the cartilage supporting his hip while he was undergoing tests following a hip injury he had on the field during a 1991 NFL Playoff game. Avascular necrosis of the hip was also identified in a routine medical check-up on quarterback Brett Favre following his trade to the Green Bay Packers in 1992. However, Favre would go on to have a long career at the Packers.

Another high-profile athlete was American road racing cyclist Floyd Landis, winner of the 2006 Tour de France, the title being subsequently stripped from his record by cycling's governing bodies after his blood samples tested positive for banned substances. During that tour, Landis was allowed cortisone shots to help manage his ailment despite cortisone also being a banned substance in professional cycling at the time.

Rafael Nadal successfully continued his tennis career after having surgery for Mueller–Weiss syndrome (osteonecrosis of the navicular bone in the foot). YouTuber Steve Wallis has revealed that he has the condition in his hip.

== See also ==
- Sperm whale skeletons can show damage from avascular necrosis caused by decompression.
