= Graziela Preiser =

German pattern and textile designer

- Education: Werkkunstschule Hannover
- Known for: Textile design
- Children: Nina Nägel

Graziela Preiser is a German pattern and textile designer who is known for her colorful 1970s designs.

Born in Germany, she was educated at the Werkkunstschule Hannover, now called Akademie der bildenden Künste, Hanover.

For the majority of her career she worked as a creative director, graphic designer and illustrator. Alongside her work for several lifestyle magazines she is best known for her print and textile designs of the 1970s. She gained an international audience through exposure in the magazine Brigitte.

By 1973, the name Graziela had become synonymous with her style. Typical of her creations are cheerful colours and a clear, timeless graphic design which was hugely popular in the 1970s.

In 2008, alongside her daughter Nina Nägel, Preiser founded the company byGraziela to relaunch her 1970s designs.
