= Preiser disease =

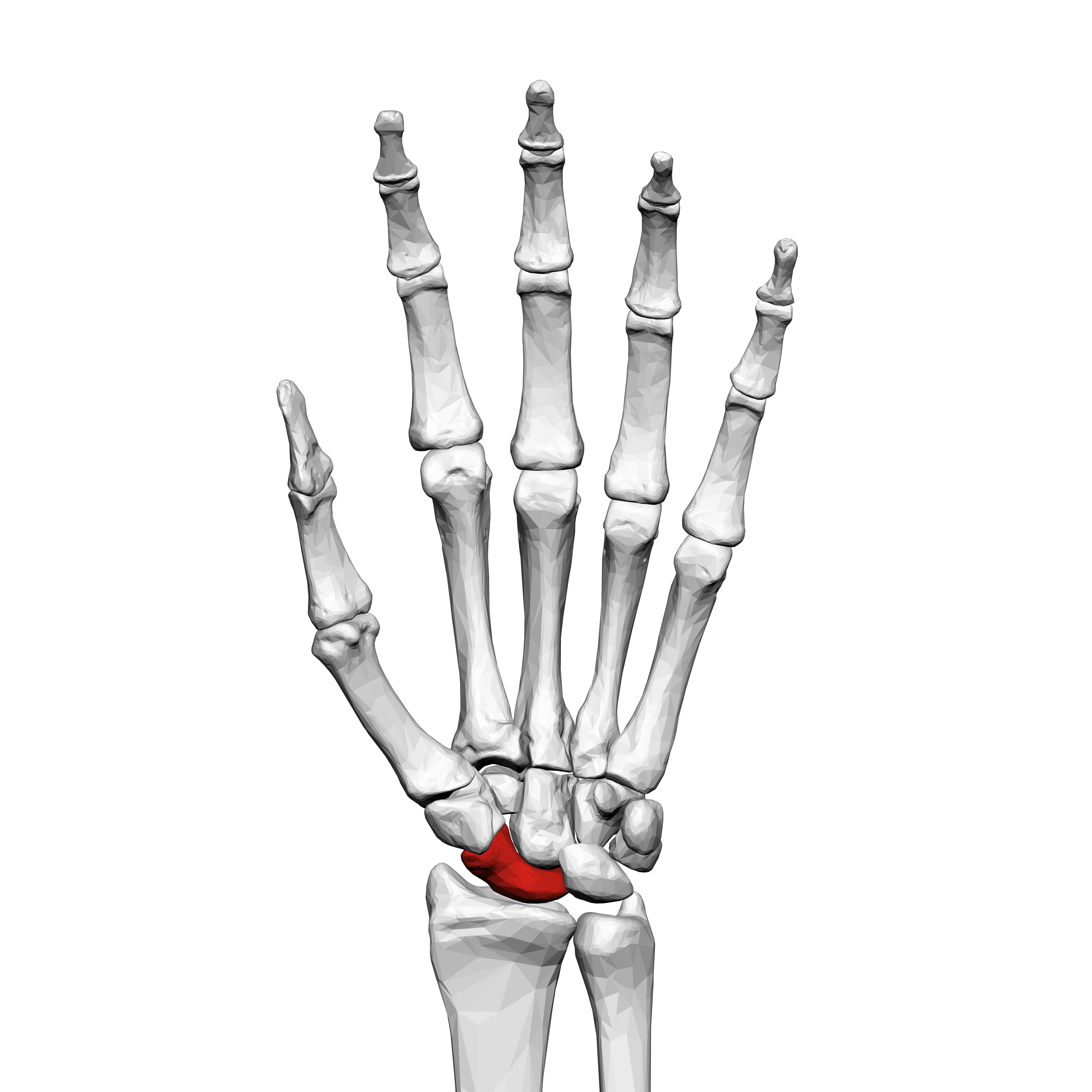
- Scaphoid bone

Preiser disease, or (idiopathic) avascular necrosis of the scaphoid, is a rare condition where ischemia and necrosis of the scaphoid bone occurs without previous fracture. It is thought to be caused by repetitive microtrauma or side effects of drugs (e.g., steroids or chemotherapy) in conjunction with existing defective vascular supply to the proximal pole of the scaphoid. MRI coupled with CT and X-ray are the methods of choice for diagnosis.

Preiser's disease is initially treated by immobilising the wrist with a cast. However, in most cases the avascular scaphoid will start to collapse leading to degeneration within the wrist joints. This often requires surgical intervention to prevent the progression of arthris. Two commonly performed procedures are: 1. Proximal row carpectomy (PRC), which involves removing the first row of the carpal bones, i.e. the scaphoid, lunate and triquetrum. The wrist is immobilised in a cast for six weeks after the surgery and then physiotherapy is started. 2. Scaphoid excision and 4-corner fusion, which is a procedure consisting of the removal of the scaphoid and fixation of the remaining wrist bones with a plate (called a "spider plate") or wires in order to provide stability. The plate usually is left inside the patient's wrist, while the wires (usually K-wires) have to be removed in a second surgery. This procedure of partial wrist fusion allows for limited wrist movement, whereas total wrist fusion immobilizes the wrist permanently. Following surgery it can take several months for affected patients to regain strength. Unfortunately both of these operations are salvage procedures and movements in the wrist will be significantly reduced.

== History ==
First described by Preiser in 1910 in 5 patients, all with previous history of wrist trauma, and scaphoid fractures in 3 of them.

== See also ==
- Four corner fusion
