= Index of trauma and orthopaedics articles =

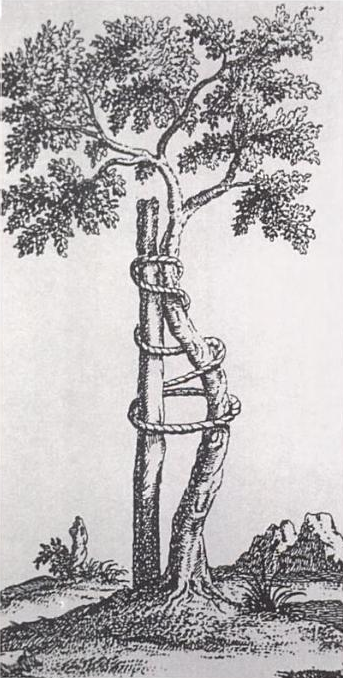
The Tree of Andry

Orthopedic surgery is the branch of surgery concerned with conditions involving the musculoskeletal system. Orthopedic surgeons use both surgical and nonsurgical means to treat musculoskeletal injuries, sports injuries, degenerative diseases, infections, bone tumours, and congenital limb deformities. Trauma surgery and traumatology is a sub-specialty dealing with the operative management of fractures, major trauma and the multiply-injured patient.

List excludes anatomical terminology covered in index of anatomy articles.

== A ==
Abbreviated Injury Scale - Acetabular fracture - Acheiropodia - Achilles tendon rupture - Acromioplasty - Adamantinoma - Adhesive capsulitis of shoulder - Advanced trauma life support - Ainhum - Akin osteotomy - Albers-Schonberg disease - Albright's hereditary osteodystrophy - Allis test - ALPSA lesion - Amelia (birth defect) - American Joint Replacement Registry - Amphiarthrosis - Andersson lesion - Aneurysmal bone cyst - Ankle replacement - Anterior cruciate ligament injury - Anterior cruciate ligament reconstruction - Antley–Bixler syndrome - Apert syndrome - Apley grind test - Apley scratch test - Apprehension test - Arachnodactyly - Arm fracture - Arthralgia - Arthritis - Arthrocentesis - Arthrodesis - Arthrogram - Arthrogryposis - Arthroplasty - Arthroscopy - Arthrotomy - Articular capsule - Articular cartilage repair - Astragalectomy - Autologous chondrocyte implantation - Avascular necrosis - Avulsion fracture

== B ==
Baastrup's sign - Baker's cyst - Baksi's prosthesis - Ballottement - Bankart lesion - Bankart's fracture - Barlow maneuver - Barré–Liéou syndrome - Barton's fracture - Baumann's angle - Beals syndrome - Bechterew's - Bennett's fracture - Bifid rib - Bimalleolar fracture - Blount's disease - Blumensaat's line - Blunt trauma - Bohler's angle - Bone cutter - Bone cyst - Bone density - Bone disease - Bone fracture - Bone fracture healing - Bone grafting - Bone healing - Bone metastases - Bone mineral - Bone pathology - Bone remodeling - Bone resorption - Bone tumor - Bone - Bosworth fracture - Bouchard's nodes - Boutonniere deformity - Boxer's fracture - Brachydactyly - British Orthopaedic Association - Brodie abscess - Broström procedure - Brown tumor - Bruck syndrome - Brunelli procedure - Bryant's traction - Buddy wrapping - Bumper fracture - Bunion - Burst fracture

== C ==
Calcaneal fracture - Camurati–Engelmann disease - Cancellous bone - Cartilage - Cartilaginous joint - Catel–Manzke syndrome - Cenani–Lenz syndactylism - Cervical dislocation - Cervical fracture - Cervical rib - Chalkstick fracture - Chance fracture - Chandler's disease - Charnley prosthesis - Charnley retractor - Chauffeur's fracture - Child bone fracture - Chondroblast - Chondroblastoma - Chondrocyte - Chondrogenesis - Chondromalacia patellae - Chondromyxoid fibroma - Chondrosarcoma - Chopart's fracture-dislocation - Clarke's test - Clavicle fracture - Clay-shoveler fracture - Cleidocranial dysostosis - Clinodactyly - Club foot - Clubbed thumb - Cobb angle - Codman triangle - Cole carpenter syndrome - Colles' fracture - Combined tibia and fibula fracture - Compartment syndrome - Complex regional pain syndrome - Compression fracture - Computer-assisted orthopedic surgery - Congenital knee dislocation - Congenital limb deformities - Congenital patellar dislocation - Conradi–Hünermann syndrome - Coopernail's sign - Cortical bone - Cotrel–Dubousset instrumentation - Coxa valga - Coxa vara - Cozen's test - Crus fracture - Crush injury - Crush syndrome - Cubitus valgus - Cubitus varus - Cunningham shoulder reduction - Currarino syndrome

== D ==
Danis–Weber classification - Darrach's procedure - Darrah procedure - De Quervain syndrome - Denis Browne bar - Denis classification - Destot's sign - Diaphysis - Diffuse idiopathic skeletal hyperostosis - Discectomy - Discoid meniscus - Dislocated shoulder - Dislocation of hip - Displacement (orthopedic surgery) - Distal radius fracture - Distraction osteogenesis - Drawer test - Dupuytren's contracture - Durkan's test - Duverney fracture - Dynamic compression plate - Dynamic hip screw - Dysplasia epiphysealis hemimelica

== E ==
Early appropriate care - Ecchondroma - Ectrodactyly - Ectromelia - Ehlers–Danlos syndrome - Eiken syndrome - Elbow examination - Elbow extension test - Ellis–van Creveld syndrome - Enchondroma - Enchondromatosis - Ender's nail - Endochondral ossification - Endosteum - Enthesis - Epiphyseal plate - Epiphysiodesis - Epiphysis - Erlenmeyer flask deformity - Essex-Lopresti fracture - Evans technique - Evans-Jensen classification - Ewing's sarcoma - Exostosis - External fixation - Extraskeletal chondroma

== F ==
Fairbank's changes - Fairbanks disease - Fat embolism - Femoral fracture - Femoral head ostectomy - Fibrocartilage callus - Fibrocartilage - Fibrosarcoma - Fibrous dysplasia of bone - Fibrous joint - Fibular fracture - Ficat classification - Finkelstein's test - Fixation (surgical) - Flat bone - Flat feet - Flexion teardrop fracture - Foot drop - Foot fracture - Forearm fracture - Frankel's sign - Freiberg disease - Froment's sign - Frykman classification

== G ==
Gaenslen's test - Galeazzi fracture - Galeazzi test - Gamekeeper's thumb - Garden classification - Garre's sclerosing osteomyelitis - Gartland classification - Genu recurvatum - Genu valgum - Genu varum - Gerber's test - Gerdy's tubercle - Geriatric trauma - Giant-cell tumor of bone - Gigli saw - Gilula's Lines - Girdlestone's Procedure - Gorham's disease - Gosselin fracture - Greenstick fracture - Grosse-Kempf nail - Gruen zone - Gustilo open fracture classification - Guyon's Canal

== H ==
Haglund's deformity - Hajdu–Cheney syndrome - Hallux rigidus - Hallux valgus - Hallux varus - Hammer toe - Hand deformity - Hand fracture - Hand of benediction - Hand surgery - Hangman's fracture - Haruguchi classification - Hardinge lateral approach to the hip - Harrington rod - Harris Hip Score - Harris lines - Harrison's groove - Haversian canal - Hawkin's classification - Hawkins-Kennedy test - Heberden's node - Hemarthrosis - Hematoma - Hemimelia - Herbert classification - Herbert screw - Herscovici classification - High ankle sprain - High tibial osteotomy - Hilgenreiner's line - Hill–Sachs lesion - Hip dysplasia (human) - Hip examination - Hip fracture - Hip replacement - Hip resurfacing - Hip spica cast - Hoffa fracture - Holdsworth fracture - Holstein–Lewis fracture - Hubscher's maneuver - Hueter-Volkmann law - Human musculoskeletal system - Hume fracture - Hume fracture - Humerus fracture - Humphrey's ligament - Hyaline cartilage - Hydroxylapatite - Hyperostosis - Hypertrophic pulmonary osteoarthropathy

== I ==
Ideberg classification - Ilizarov apparatus - Infantile cortical hyperostosis - Injury Severity Score - Internal fixation - Intervertebral disc annuloplasty - Intervertebral disc arthroplasty - Intramedullary rod - Intramembranous ossification - Involucrum - Irregular bone - Iselin's disease

== J ==
Jansen's metaphyseal chondrodysplasia - Jefferson fracture - Jobe's test - Joint dislocation - Joint locking (symptom) - Joint replacement - Joint replacement registry - Joint stiffness - Joint - Jones fracture - Juvenile osteoporosis

== K ==
Kanavel's cardinal signs - Kapandji score - Kashin–Beck disease - Keller procedure - Kellgren-Lawrence grading scale - Khyphoplasty - Kienbock's disease - Kirschner wire - Klein's line - Klippel–Feil syndrome - Klippel–Trénaunay–Weber syndrome - Knee cartilage replacement therapy - Knee examination - Knee replacement - Kniest dysplasia - Kocher criteria - Kocher manoeuvre - Köhler disease - Krukenberg procedure - Kuntscher nail

== L ==
Lachman test - Larrey's sign - Larsen syndrome - Lasègue's sign - Latarjet procedure - Lauge-Hansen classification - Legg–Calvé–Perthes syndrome - Ligamentous laxity - Limb lengthening methods - Lisfranc fracture - Lisfranc joint - Lisfranc ligament - List of orthopedic implants - Lister's tubercle - Lobstein syndrome - Loder classification - Long bone - Loosers zone - Lunotriquetral shear test - Luxating patella

== M ==
Madelung's deformity - Maffucci syndrome - Maisonneuve fracture - Major trauma - Malgaigne's fracture - Malunion - March fracture - Marfan syndrome - Marie-Strümpell disease - Marshall syndrome - Marshall–Smith syndrome - Martin-Gruber Anastomosis - Mayfield classification - McCune–Albright syndrome - McMurray test - Medullary cavity - Melnick–Needles syndrome - Melorheostosis - Mesenchymal chondrosarcoma - Metaphysis - Metatarsophalangeal joint sprain - Microfracture surgery - Milch classification - Mirel's Score - Monostotic fibrous dysplasia - Monteggia fracture - Moore or Southern posterior approach to the hip - Moore's fracture - Moore's pin - Morton's neuroma - Morton's toe - Mulder's sign - Müller AO Classification of fractures - Multiple epiphyseal dysplasia - Mumford procedure - Musculoskeletal injury - Myxoid chondrosarcoma

== N ==
National hip fracture database - Neer classification - Neer impingement sign - Neer's prosthesis - Nonossifying fibroma - Nonunion - Nonunion of fracture - Nursemaid's elbow

== O ==
O'Brien's test - Ober's test - Oligodactyly - Ollier disease - Orthopaedic pathology - Orthopaedic procedure - Orthopedic cast - Orthopedic plaster casts - Orthopedic plates - Orthopedic surgery - Orthotics - Ortolani test - Ortolani test - Osgood–Schlatter disease - Osseointegration - Osseous tissue - Ossification center - Ossification - Ostectomy - Osteitis fibrosa cystica - Osteitis - Osteoarthritis - Osteoblast - Osteoblastoma - Osteochondritis dissecans - Osteochondritis - Osteochondrodysplasia - Osteochondroma - Osteochondromatosis - Osteochondrosis - Osteoclast - Osteocyte - Osteofibrous dysplasia - Osteogenesis imperfecta - Osteoid osteoma - Osteoid - Osteolysis - Osteoma - Osteomalacia - Osteomyelitis - Osteon - Osteopetrosis - Osteophyte - Osteoporosis - Osteosarcoma - Osteosclerosis - Osteostimulation - Osteotomy

== P ==
Paget's disease of bone - Panner disease - Patella alta - Patella baja - Patella fracture - Patellar dislocation - Patellar tendon rupture - Pathologic fracture - Patrick's test - Patrick's test - Pauwel's angle - Pauwel's classification - Pectus carinatum - Pectus excavatum - Pediatric trauma - Pelvic fracture - Penetrating trauma - Perichondrium - Periosteal reaction - Periosteum - Periostitis - Perkin's line - Perthes Lesion - Pes cavus - Phalen maneuver - Phocomelia - Physical therapy - Pigeon toe - Pigmented villonodular synovitis - Pilon fracture - Pipkin classification - Pipkin fracture-dislocation - Pivot-shift test - Plafond fracture - Polydactyly - Polyostotic fibrous dysplasia - Polytrauma - Ponseti method - Porotic hyperostosis - Pott's fracture - Preiser disease - Proteus syndrome - Protrusio acetabuli - Pseudarthrosis - Pulled hamstring - Pycnodysostosis - Pyogenic osteomyelitis

== Q ==
Quadriceps tendon rupture

== R ==
Radius fracture - Rapadilino syndrome - Reduction (orthopedic surgery) - Resuscitation - Resuscitative thoracotomy - Rett syndrome - Revised Trauma Score - Rib fracture - Rickets - Rocker bottom foot - Rolando fracture - Rotationplasty - Rotator cuff tear - Rowe Score - Rubinstein–Taybi syndrome - Ruedi-Allgower classification - Rush nail

== S ==
Sacralization of the fifth lumbar vertebra - Salter–Harris fracture - Sanders classification - Sarcoma - Scaphoid fracture - Scapular fracture - Schenck classification - Scheuermann's disease - Schmorl's nodes - Schober's test - Schwartz–Jampel syndrome - Scoliosis - Seddon classification - Segond fracture - Seidel nail - Seinsheimer classification - Separated shoulder - Sequestrum - Sesamoid bone - Sesamoiditis - Sever's disease - Shenton's Line - Shepherd's fracture - Shin splints - Short bone - Shoulder examination - Shoulder fracture - Shoulder replacement - Shoulder surgery - Silver–Russell syndrome - Simmonds' test - Skeletal fluorosis - SLAP tear - Slipped capital femoral epiphysis - Slipped Upper Femoral Epiphysis - Smith Petersen nail - Smith-Petersen anterior approach to the hip - Smith's fracture - Soft tissue injury - Southwick angle - Speed's test - Spina bifida occulta - Spinal curvature - Spinal fracture - Spinal fusion - Spiral fracture - Splint (medicine) - Spondylolisthesis - Sports injury - Sprained ankle - Sprengel's deformity - Steinmann pin - Stener lesion - Sternal fracture - Stieda fracture - Straight leg raise - Stress fracture - Subacromial bursitis - Sudeck's atrophy - Sulcoplasty - Supracondylar fracture - Swan neck deformity - Swanson prosthesis - Swanson's arthroplasty - Symphysis - Synchondrosis - Syndactyly - Syndesmosis - Synovectomy - Synovial fluid - Synovial joint

== T ==
Talipes equinovarus - Talwalkar nail - Taylor Spatial Frame - Tear of meniscus - Teisen classification - Tendon transfer - Tension band wiring - Teunissen–Cremers syndrome - Thomas test - Thompson and Epstein classification - Thompson test - Thurstan Holland sign - Tibia fracture - Tibial plateau fracture - Tietze syndrome - Tile classification - Tillaux-Chaput avulsion fracture - Tinel sign - Toddler's fracture - Tommy John surgery - Trabecula - Traction (orthopedics) - Traction splint - Trauma center - Trauma surgery - Trauma team - Traumatology - Trendelenburg gait - Trendelenburg's sign - Trethowan's sign - Trevor's disease - Triage - Trimalleolar fracture - Triple arthrodesis - Tscherne classification - Tumoral calcinosis

== U ==
Ulnar fracture - Unhappy triad - Unicompartmental knee arthroplasty - Upington disease

== V ==
Valgus deformity - Valgus stress test - Vancouver classification - Varus deformity - Vertebral osteomyelitis - Villonodular synovitis - Volkmann's canals - Volkmann's contracture - Volkmann avulsion fracture

== W ==
Waddell's signs - Wagstaffe-Le Fort avulsion fracture - Wallis–Zieff–Goldblatt syndrome - Wassel classification - Watson-Jones anterolateral approach to the hip - Watson's test - Weaver–Dunn procedure - Webbed toes - Wedge fracture - Weil's osteotomy - Wilson test - Winged scapula - Wolff's law - WOMAC - Wound healing - Wrist drop - Wrist osteoarthritis

== Y ==
Yergason's test - Young-Burgess classification

== Z ==
Zadek's procedure
