= List of orthopaedic eponyms =

This is a list of eponyms and other named terms used in orthopedic surgery and related musculoskeletal medicine. It includes fractures, anatomical structures, clinical signs, surgical procedures, implants, instruments, radiographic signs, and classification systems that are named after the physicians or individuals who described or developed them.

== Fractures ==
- Aviator's fracture
- Bankart's fracture
- Barton's fracture
- Bennett's fracture
- Boxer's fracture
- Bumper fracture
- Burst fracture
- Bosworth fracture
- Chance fracture
- Chopart's fracture-dislocation
- Clay-Shoveller fracture
- Colles' fracture
- Cotton's fracture
- Dupuytren's fracture
- Duverney fracture
- Essex-Lopresti fracture
- Galeazzi fracture
- Gosselin fracture
- Hangman's fracture
- Holstein–Lewis fracture
- Holdsworth fracture
- Hutchinson's fracture
- Hoffa fracture
- Hume fracture
- Jefferson fracture
- Jones fracture
- Lisfranc fracture
- March fracture
- Maisonneuve fracture
- Malgaigne's fracture
- Monteggia fracture
- Moore's fracture
- Night-stick fracture
- Pilon fracture
- Pipkin fracture-dislocation
- Plafond fracture
- Pott's fracture
- Rolando fracture
- Segond fracture
- Shepherd's fracture
- Side-swipe fracture
- Smith's fracture
- Stieda fracture
- Straddle fracture
- Tillaux-Chaput avulsion fracture
- Wagstaffe-Le Fort avulsion fracture
- Volkmann avulsion fracture

== Orthopedic classifications ==
- Bado classification
- Danis–Weber classification
- Denis classification
- Evans-Jensen classification
- Ficat classification
- Frykman classification
- Garden classification
- Gartland classification
- Gruen zone
- Gustilo open fracture classification
- Haruguchi classification
- Hawkin's classification
- Herbert classification
- Herscovici classification
- Ideberg classification
- Jupiter and Mehne classification
- Lauge-Hansen classification
- Le Fort fracture of skull
- Loder classification
- Mayfield classification
- Milch classification
- Neer classification
- Pipkin classification
- Pauwel's classification
- Riseborough and Radin classification
- Ruedi-Allgower classification
- Salter–Harris fracture
- Schatzker classification of tibia plateau fractures
- Tile classification
- Schatzker classification of olecranon fractures
- Sanders classification
- Seddon classification
- Seinsheimer classification
- Schenck classification
- Teisen classification
- Tscherne classification
- Thompson and Epstein classification
- Vancouver classification
- Wassel classification
- Winquist and Hansen classification
- Young-Burgess classification

== Procedures ==
- Akin osteotomy
- Bankart repair
- Broström procedure
- Brunelli procedure
- Cotrel–Dubousset instrumentation
- Cunningham Shoulder Reduction
- Darrach's procedure
- Evans technique
- Girdlestone's Procedure
- Keller procedure
- Kocher manoeuvre
- Krukenberg procedure
- Latarjet procedure
- Mumford procedure
- Ponseti method
- Swanson's Arthroplasty
- Tommy John surgery
- Weil's Osteotomy
- Weaver–Dunn procedure
- Zadek's procedure

== Anatomy ==
- Gerdy's tubercle
- Guyon's Canal
- Harrison's groove
- Haversian canal
- Humphrey's ligament
- Lisfranc joint
- Lisfranc ligament
- Lister's tubercle
- Martin-Gruber Anastomosis
- Schmorl's nodes
- Volkmann's canals

== CPRs ==
- Harris Hip Score
- Kocher criteria
- Mirel's Score
- Rowe Score

== Clinical signs ==
- Andersson lesion
- Baastrup's sign
- Bouchard's nodes
- Boutonniere deformity
- Coopernail's sign
- Codman triangle
- Destot's sign
- Frankel's sign
- Heberden's node
- Kanavel's sign
- Larrey's sign
- Trendelenburg gait

== Clinical examination ==
- Allis test
- Apley grind test
- Apley scratch test
- Barlow's maneuver
- Clarke's test
- Cozen's test
- Cotton test
- Durkan's test
- Finkelstein's test
- Froment's sign
- Jobe's test
- Kapandji score
- Gaenslen's test
- Galeazzi test
- Gerber's test
- Hawkins–Kennedy test
- Hubscher's maneuver
- Lachman test
- Lasègue's sign
- McMurray test
- Mulder's sign
- Neer impingement sign
- O'Brien's test
- Ober's test
- Ortolani test
- Patrick's test
- Phalen maneuver
- Simmonds' test
- Schober's test
- Speed's test
- Thomas test
- Thompson test
- Tinel sign
- Trendelenburg's sign
- Yergason's test
- Waddell's signs
- Watson's test
- Wilson test

== Congenital conditions ==
- Albers-Schonberg disease
- Albright's hereditary osteodystrophy
- Antley–Bixler syndrome
- Apert syndrome
- Beals syndrome
- Bechterew's
- Bruck syndrome
- Camurati–Engelmann disease
- Catel–Manzke syndrome
- Cole carpenter syndrome
- Conradi–Hünermann syndrome
- Currarino syndrome
- Ehlers–Danlos syndrome
- Eiken syndrome
- Ellis–van Creveld syndrome
- Erlenmeyer flask deformity
- Fairbanks disease
- Hajdu–Cheney syndrome
- Jansen's metaphyseal chondrodysplasia
- Kashin–Beck disease
- Klippel–Feil syndrome
- Klippel–Trénaunay–Weber syndrome
- Kniest dysplasia
- Lobstein syndrome
- Madelung's deformity
- Maffucci syndrome
- Marfan syndrome
- Marie-Strümpell disease
- Marshall syndrome
- Marshall–Smith syndrome
- McCune–Albright syndrome
- Melnick–Needles syndrome
- Morton's toe
- Ollier disease
- Rett syndrome
- Rubinstein–Taybi syndrome
- Scheuermann's disease
- Schwartz–Jampel syndrome
- Silver–Russell syndrome
- Teunissen–Cremers syndrome
- Trevor disease
- Wiedemann syndrome

== Acquired conditions ==
- Baker's cyst
- Bankart lesion
- Barré–Liéou syndrome
- Blount's disease
- Brodie abscess
- Chandler's disease
- De Quervain syndrome
- Dupuytren's contracture
- Ewing's sarcoma
- Freiberg disease
- Garre's sclerosing osteomyelitis
- Gorham's disease
- Haglund's deformity
- Hill–Sachs lesion
- Iselin's disease
- Kashin–Beck disease
- Kienbock's disease
- Köhler disease
- Legg–Calvé–Perthes syndrome
- Morton's neuroma
- O'Donoghue's triad
- Osgood–Schlatter disease
- Paget's disease of bone
- Panner disease
- Perthes Lesion
- Preiser disease
- Sever's disease
- Stener lesion
- Sudeck's atrophy
- Tietze syndrome
- Volkmann's contracture

== Orthopedic implants ==
- Austin Moore prosthesis
- Baksi's prosthesis
- Charnley prosthesis
- Denis Browne bar
- Ender's nail
- Grosse-Kempf nail
- Harrington rod
- Herbert screw
- Kirschner wire
- Kuntscher nail
- Moore's pin
- Neer's prosthesis
- Rush nail
- Schanz screw
- Seidel nail
- Smith Petersen nail
- Steinmann pin
- Swanson prosthesis
- Talwalkar nail
- Thompson prosthesis

== Orthopaedic instruments ==
- Bryant's traction
- Charnley Retractor
- Darrach elevator
- Faraboeuf forceps
- Gigli saw
- Hohmann retractor
- Ilizarov apparatus
- Inge retractor
- Jungbluth forceps
- Matta forceps
- Taylor Spatial Frame
- Thomas splint
- Verbrugge forceps
- Volkmann retractor
- Weber forceps

== Surgical approaches ==
- Hardinge lateral approach to the hip
- Moore or Southern posterior approach to the hip
- Smith-Petersen anterior approach to the hip
- Watson-Jones anterolateral approach to the hip

== Radiographic signs ==
- Baumann's angle
- Blumensaat's line
- Bohler's angle
- Cobb angle
- Fairbank's changes
- Gilula's Lines
- Harris lines
- Hilgenreiner's line
- Kellgren-Lawrence grading scale
- Klein's line
- Loosers zone
- Pauwel's angle
- Perkin's line
- Shenton's Line
- Southwick angle
- Thurstan Holland sign
- Trethowan's sign
- Terry Thomas sign

== Radiographic projections ==
- Judet view
- Broden's view

== Principles ==
- Wolff's law
- Hueter-Volkmann law
- Charley's principles of three-point fixation
