= Darrah =

Darrah may refer to:

== People ==
- John W. Darrah (1938–2017), United States federal judge
- Lydia Darragh (1728–1789), who provided intelligence to George Washington
- Thomas Walter Darrah (1873–1955), United States military officer

== Places ==
- Darrah, Alabama, United States
- Darrah National Park, in Rajasthan, India

== Other ==
- Darrah procedure, surgical procedure
