= Shoulder examination =

Physical inspection of the shoulder

A shoulder examination (or shoulder exam) is a portion of a physical examination used to identify potential pathology involving the shoulder. It should be conducted with both shoulders exposed to assess for asymmetry and muscle wasting.

== Elements of the shoulder exam ==
- Inspection
- Palpation of sternoclavicular joint, clavicle, acromioclavicular joint, subacromial bursa, bicipital tendon.
- Evaluation of passive and active range of motion: Neck range of motion should be assessed that may reveal a neck source of shoulder pain. The Apley scratch test specifically tests range of motion and in a normal exam, an individual should be able to reach C7 on external rotation, and T7 on internal rotation.
- Evaluation of distal pulses
- Strength testing: wrist extension tests the radial nerve, finger abduction tests the ulnar nerve, and thumb apposition tests the median nerve.
- Sensation testing
- Reflex testing: Triceps reflex tests C6-C8, biceps reflex tests C5 and C6, and brachioradialis reflex tests C5-C7.
- Provocative maneuvers

== Provocative maneuvers specific to the shoulder examination ==
=== Tests for rotator cuff pathology ===
- Neer Impingement Test: a positive test indicates shoulder impingement syndrome
- Hawkins–Kennedy test: a positive test indicates shoulder impingement syndrome
- Empty beer can test: a positive test indicates rotator cuff tear, specifically, supraspinatus muscle tear
- Drop arm test: a positive test indicates a supraspinatus tear
- External Rotation test: a positive test indicates an infraspinatus or teres minor tear
- Lift-off test: a positive test indicates subscapularis pathology

=== Tests for bicipital tenosynovitis and labral pathology ===
- Yergason's test
- Speed's test
- Biceps load test
- O'Brien's test: positive test indicates a SLAP (or superior labral tear from anterior to posterior) tear

=== Tests for shoulder instability ===
- Apprehension test or Jobe's test: positive test indicates anterior glenohumeral instability
- Relocation test

=== Other tests ===
- Cross-arm test: positive test indicates acromioclavicular joint degeneration/arthritis
- Adson's sign tests for thoracic outlet syndrome
- Lhermitte's sign may indicate cervical radiculopathy or spinal cord disease
- Spurling's test tests for cervical spine disease

A meta-analysis in 2008 concluded that the diagnostic accuracy of individual tests in the shoulder examination was limited, specifically that the Hawkins–Kennedy test and the Speed test have no discriminatory ability to diagnose specific shoulder pathology, and that results of studies evaluating other tests were too statistically heterogeneous to make meaningful conclusions about their diagnostic accuracy.

Examination of the shoulder can be complex because the shoulder can present with more than one pathology at a time.
