= Jean Verbrugge =

Belgian fencer

Personal information
- Born: 16 December 1896 Sofia
- Died: 7 January 1964 (aged 67) Antwerp, Belgium

Sport
- Sport: Fencing

Jean Pierre Verbrugge (16 December 1896 – 7 January 1964) was a Belgian orthopedic surgeon, professor at Ghent University, and the inventor of the Verbrugge forceps as well as other surgical tools. Early in his career, he was also an accomplished fencer who competed for Belgium at the 1920 and 1928 Summer Olympics.

Dr. Verbrugge authored 175 publications on orthopedic medicine and served as President of the Belgian Orthopedic Association three times.
