= Outline of trauma and orthopedics =

The following outline is provided as an overview of and topical guide to trauma and orthopaedics:

Orthopedic surgery – branch of surgery concerned with conditions involving the musculoskeletal system. Orthopedic surgeons use both surgical and nonsurgical means to treat musculoskeletal injuries, sports injuries, degenerative diseases, infections, bone tumours, and congenital limb deformities. Trauma surgery and traumatology is a sub-specialty dealing with the operative management of fractures, major trauma and the multiply-injured patient.

== Branches of trauma and orthopaedics ==
- Elective
  - Foot and ankle
  - Soft-tissue knee reconstruction
  - Knee arthroplasty
  - Hip arthroplasty
  - Spinal
  - Upper limb (shoulder & elbow)
  - Wrist & hand
  - Osteosarcoma and limb reconstruction
  - Peripheral nerve injury
- Trauma surgery
- Paediatric and congenital osteochondrodysplasia

== History of trauma and orthopaedics ==
History of trauma and orthopaedics

== General trauma and orthopaedics concepts ==
- Principles of managing trauma
  - Advanced trauma life support
  - Emergency management
  - Triage
- Basic sciences in orthopaedics
  - Anatomy
    - Cartilage
    - Bone
      - Osseous tissue
      - Cortical bone, Cancellous bone
      - Epiphysis, Metaphysis, Diaphysis
      - Long bone, Short bone, Flat bone, Irregular bone, Sesamoid bone
    - Joint
      - Synovial joint
      - Fibrous joint
      - Cartilaginous joint
  - Physiology
    - Bone healing
      - Ossification
  - Pathology
    - Bone fracture
      - Spiral fracture, Avulsion fracture, Stress fracture, Burst fracture, Compression fracture
      - Pathologic fracture
    - Arthritis
      - Osteoarthritis
      - Septic arthritis
    - Osteochondropathy
      - Osteopathies (Osteoporosis, Osteomyelitis, Pseudarthrosis)
      - Chondropathies
    - Sarcomas
      - Bone tumor (Osteoma)
      - Cartilage tumor (Chondroma)
- Orthopaedic principles
  - Diagnostics
    - Examination
    - Radiography
  - Reduction
    - Splinting and casting
    - Traction
  - Fixation
    - Internal fixation
      - Intramedullary rod
    - External fixation
  - Rehabilitation
    - Physical therapy
    - Orthotics
  - Descriptive terms
    - Displacement
    - Comminution
- General procedure types
  - Arthroplasty
  - Arthrocentesis
  - Osteotomy
  - Distraction osteogenesis
  - Bone grafting
  - Arthrodesis
- Biomechanics
- List of orthopedic implants
- Computer-assisted orthopedic surgery

== Trauma and Orthopaedics organizations ==
- British Orthopaedic Association
- American Academy of Orthopaedic Surgeons
- AO Foundation

== Trauma and Orthopaedics publications ==
- Journal of Bone and Joint Surgery
- Journal of Orthopedics
- Journal of Orthopedic Trauma
- Journal of the American Academy of Orthopedic Sciences
- Journal of the American Podiatric Medical Association
- Clinical Journal of Sport medicine
- New England Journal of medicine

== Persons influential in trauma and orthopaedics ==
- Hugh Owen Thomas, b. 1834, d. 1891 (aged 56), Welsh surgeon considered the father of orthopaedic surgery in Britain
- Jean-Andre Venel, b. 1740, d. 1791 (aged 50), Swiss doctor and a pioneer in the field of orthopedics
- John Hunter, b. 1728, d. 1793 (aged 64), Scottish surgeon
- Percivall Pott, b. 1714, d. 1788 (aged 73), English surgeon, one of the founders of orthopedy
- Robert Jones, b. 1857, d. 1933 (aged 75), British surgeon pioneering the use of x-rays
- John Charnley, b. 1911, d. 1982 (aged 70), English pioneer of hip replacements
- Nicolas Andry, b. 1658, d. 1742 (aged 83), French physician
