= Slump test =

The slump test is an orthopedic test used to determine if a patient has sciatic nerve impingement.

== Purpose ==
The purpose of this test is to place tension on the dural sheath of the sciatic nerve.

== Procedure ==
Patient should be sitting on the edge of the table while the examiner is by the side of the patient.

The slump test consists of several different steps:

1. First, the patient slumps forward, rounding the shoulders so the examiner will then apply pressure to the trunk flexion.
2. Next, the patient brings chin to chest and the knee is then actively extended.
3. Afterwards, the ankle is dorsiflexed. If pain is produced during any of the above steps the examiner does not have to continue the test.

The test has several modifications all of which use different sequences of motions that create tension on the dural sheath.

== Mechanism ==
The dural sheath around the sciatic nerve is being stressed or stretched as the patient changes positions.

== Results ==
Positive sign is any kind of sciatic pain (radiating, sharp, shooting pain) or reproduction of other neurological symptoms. This indicates impingement of the sciatic nerve, dural lining, spinal cord, or nerve roots. This test can have a lot of false-positives and should be used with other orthopedic test to make the final diagnosis.

== History ==
Charles Lasègue is credited for creating the slump test. Used with the Bragard maneuver, it has been considered the gold standard in the medical community.
