= Franklin Adin Simmonds =

British orthopaedic surgeon

Franklin Adin Simmonds F.R.C.S. (31 October 1910 – 14 July 1983; also known as Sam Simmonds) was a British orthopaedic surgeon for whom the Simmonds' test on rupture of the Achilles tendon is named. He also worked with the pioneering surgeon John Charnley on hip replacement surgery and became an expert in this field.

He very much disliked his given names and in adult life was universally known as Sam.

== Career ==
After education at Sherborne School in Dorset he studied at Pembroke College, Cambridge, and St Thomas's Hospital London. From 1939 to 1941 he worked with W. Rowley Bristow at St Nicholas's Hospital Pyrford (subsequently renamed Rowley Bristow Hospital Pyrford), and when Rowley Bristow became Brigadier in charge of orthopaedic services of the British Army, he recruited Simmonds into the Royal Army Medical Corps. Lt Col Simmonds commanded base hospitals in North Africa, Sicily, France and the Far East. After the war he returned to Pyrford and worked there and at The Royal Surrey County Hospital Guildford until his retirement in 1975. His simple but effective test for rupture of the Achilles tendon was developed in 1956/57 and is still widely used today.

A golf Blue (university sport) at Cambridge, his clinical skill with his hands was mirrored in lifelong amateur golf expertise; his 0 (zero) handicap for most of his adult life equalled that of a professional.
