= Lunotriquetral shear test =

Surgical maneuver

In orthopedic surgery, the lunotriquetral shear test or lunotriquetral shear maneuver involves stabilizing the lunate between thumb and index finger of one hand and the triquetrum between the thumb and index finger of the other. The pisiform and triquetrum are pushed in a palmar to dorsal direction. Discomfort in this area suggests the possibility of injury to the lunotriquetral interosseous ligament.
