= Pathologic fracture =

Bone breakage due to structural weakness of the bone

- Other names: Insufficiency fracture
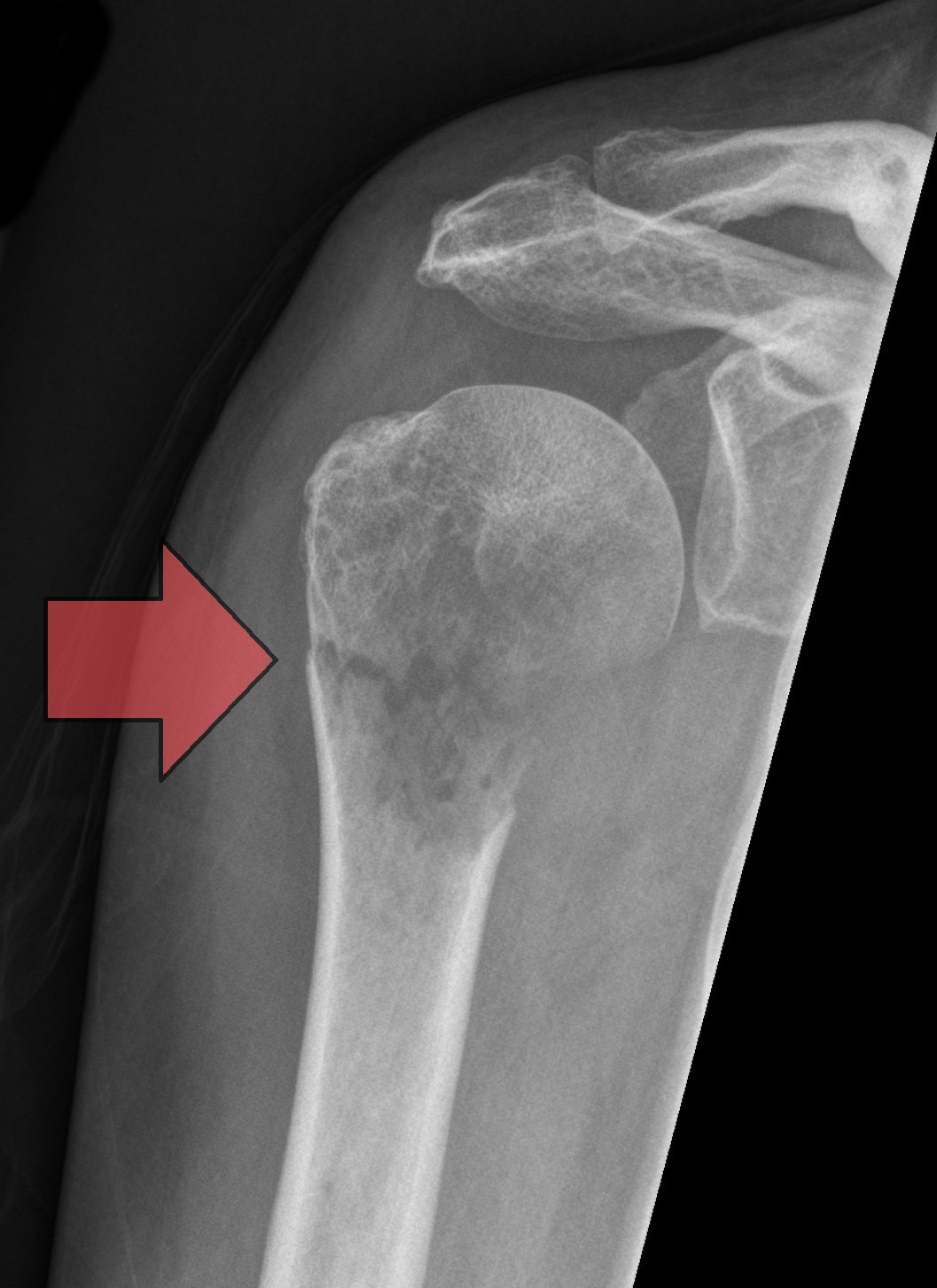
- Pathological fracture of the humerus in a patient with metastasis of renal cell carcinoma
- Specialty: Rheumatology

A pathologic fracture is a bone fracture caused by weakness of the bone structure that leads to decreased mechanical resistance to normal mechanical loads. This process is most commonly due to osteoporosis, but may also be caused by other pathologies, such as cancer, infection (such as osteomyelitis), inherited bone disorders, or a bone cyst. Only a small number of conditions are commonly responsible for pathological fractures, including osteoporosis, osteomalacia, Paget's disease, Osteitis, osteogenesis imperfecta, benign bone tumours and cysts, secondary malignant bone tumours and primary malignant bone tumours.

Fragility fracture is a type of pathologic fracture that occurs as a result of an injury that would be insufficient to cause fracture in a normal bone. There are several fracture sites said to be typical of fragility fractures: vertebral fractures, fractures of the neck of the femur, pelvic fractures, proximal humeral fractures and Colles fracture of the wrist. This definition arises because a normal human being ought to be able to fall from standing height without breaking any bones, and a fracture, therefore, suggests weakness of the skeleton.

Pathological fractures present as a chalkstick fracture in long bones, and appear as a transverse fractures nearly 90 degrees to the long axis of the bone. In a pathological compression fracture of a spinal vertebra, fractures will commonly appear to collapse the entire body of vertebra.

== Cause ==
Pathologic fractures in children and adolescents can result from a diverse array of disorders, including metabolic, endocrine, neoplastic, infectious, or immunologic disorders, or genetic skeletal dysplasias.

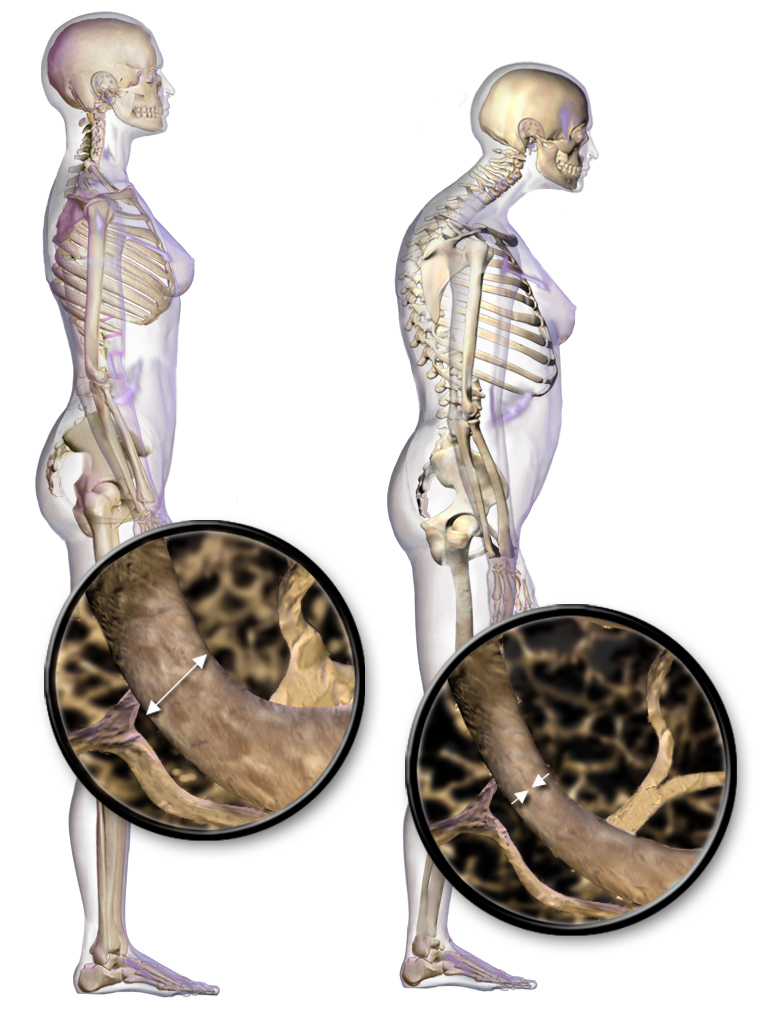
Juvenile osteoporosis

- Primary hyperparathyroidism
- Simple bone cyst
- Aneurismal bone cyst
- Osteoporosis
- Chronic osteomyelitis
- Osteogenesis imperfecta
- Osteomalacia
- Rickets
- Renal osteodystrophy
- Malignant infantile osteopetrosis
- juvenile osteoporosis
- juvenile rheumatoid arthritis

=== Miscellaneous causes ===
- Monostotic fibrous dysplasia
- Eosinophilic granuloma
- Bone atrophy secondary to diseases like polio

== Diagnosis ==
The underlying cause of the pathological fracture should always be found, in order to guide the optimal treatment path. If the cause is unknown, a thorough workup should be performed, including laboratory tests and radiological examinations, and often magnetic resonance imaging of the affected area and/or computed tomography of the chest, abdomen and pelvis (for staging or identifying a primary malignancy). Often, a biopsy from the fracture site is taken to obtain a histopathological or cytological diagnosis. A common method of initial biopsy is a Fine Needle Aspiration Cytology (FNAC).

In circumstances where other pathologies are excluded (for example, cancer), postmenopausal women or men aged 50 years of age or older with a hip fracture after a low-energy fall can be diagnosed with osteoporosis irrespective of bone mineral density, and offered treatment. Diagnosis can also be made if a previous fragility fracture of the pelvis, vertebra, wrist or proximal humerus is present in combination with osteopenia.

== Management ==
Once a fracture has occurred, intramedullary fixation is the usual surgical management for certain long bones, such as the femur, tibia, and fibula. However, the method of fixation should depend on several factors; The fracture location, underlying cause, prognosis of the underlying cause and patient activity level. Fracture healing potential is also different for different malignancies, which needs to be taken into account. For example, if the patients' life expectancy is long, fixation needs to be stronger to account for reduced healing potential, which could be an argument for total replacement of the fractured area with a prosthesis instead of internal fixation (which is dependent on fracture healing). On the other hand, in case of a patient with poor prognosis or low activity level, a minimally invasive internal fixation could be enough to improve quality of life - in this case the patient is either not expected to survive long enough for the fixation to fail, or are not active enough for reduced healing potential to become a problem.

For pathological fractures in the setting of metastatic disease where there is a need for postoperative radiation, a carbon fiber implant may be preferred due to its radiolucency, allowing better visualization of the affected area on x-ray imaging.

Several scoring systems exist to help in the evaluation of impending pathological fractures (where a pathological process has weakened the bone but not yet caused a fracture). The most commonly used are Mirel's score (for metastatic disease in long bones) and Harrington's score (for metastatic disease in the proximal femur) . For both instruments, a higher score means a higher risk of fracture, based on similar criteria; fracture location, patient symptoms, size of lesion, and type of lesion. Based on Mirel's score (if the score is more than 8), bone fixation should be done prophylactically. Fixation is done by internal fixation rather than conservatively, along with treatment of the underlying cause.
