= Drop arm test =

Medical test

The drop arm test is designed to determine a patient's ability to sustain humeral joint motion through eccentric contraction as the arm is taken through the full motion of abduction to adduction. It will determine if the patient has an underlying rotator cuff dysfunction.

== Procedure ==
The patient is asked to either sit on an examination table or stand while performing this test. Examiner should be standing on the patient's lateral side or behind the arm being evaluated. Examiner will passively abduct the patient's shoulder (humerus) to 90 degrees. The patient is then asked to slowly lower or adduct the shoulder to their side.

If the patient is unable to perform this motion, the examiner can hold the humerus at 90 degrees of abduction and apply slight pressure to the distal forearm. If the patient's arm falls to their side, this also indicates a rotator cuff dysfunction. Inability to controllably lower the arm can indicate a rotator cuff dysfunction, most commonly the supraspinatus.

== Mechanism ==
The drop arm test works by going through subluxation via the humeral head looking for a tear or weakness in the supraspinatus tendon.

== Results ==
A positive test is found if the patient cannot perform this motion of adducting the arm back to the body controllably or if the patient experiences pain while performing this test.
