= Thomas Walter Darrah =

United States Army general

Thomas Darrah
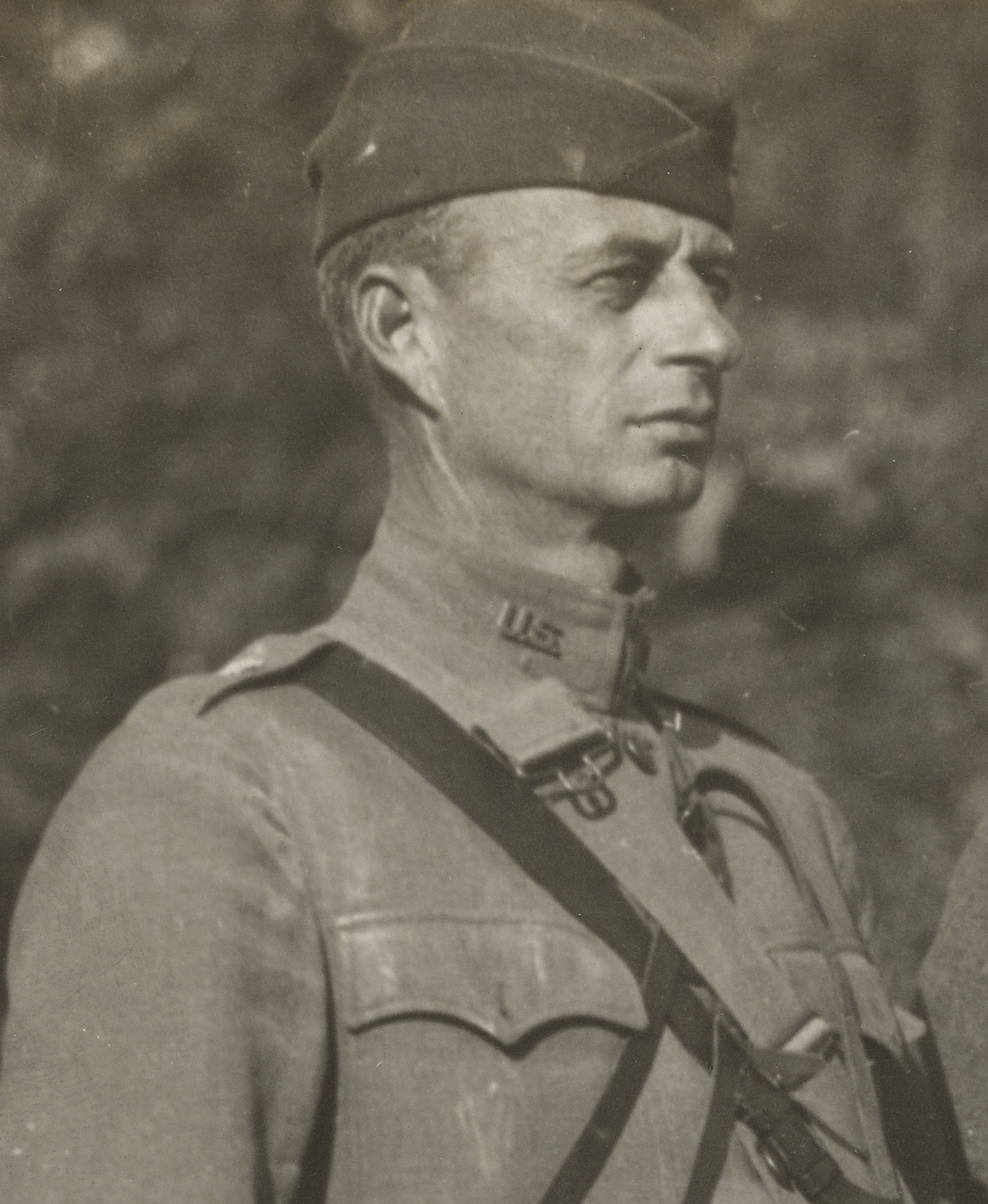
- Brig. gen. Thomas Darrah in Varennes-en-Argonne in August 1918
- Born: 11 July 1873; Marquette, Kansas
- Died: 21 January 1955 (aged 81); New York, New York
- Burial place: Arlington National Cemetery
- Military career
- Allegiance: United States of America
- Branch: United States Army
- Service years: 1895–1937
- Rank: Brigadier general
- Service number: 0-476
- Commands: 55th Brigade; 314th Infantry Regiment; 34th Infantry Regiment; Pacific Section, Panama Canal Department
- Conflicts: Spanish–American War; Philippine–American War; World War I
- Awards: Silver Star commendation
- Other work: Deputy Director of Civilian Defense for New York State (World War II)

Thomas Walter Darrah (11 July 1873 – 21 January 1955) was a United States military officer. He participated in a number of U.S. military conflicts including the Spanish–American War, the Philippine–American War and World War I.

== Early life and education ==
Darrah was born in Marquette, Kansas on 11 July 1873 to Samuel Jones Darrah and Mary, née Temperly. He graduated from the United States Military Academy at West Point on 1895, one of his classmates was Joe Wheeler Jr., the son of Joseph Wheeler, former Confederate cavalry general and later U.S. Army major general. Later in life, Darrah also graduated from the Army School of the Line (1920), the Army Staff College (1921) and the Army War College (1923).

== Military career ==
In 1895, Darrah was commissioned second lieutenant in the U.S. Army. He took part in the Spanish–American War, serving as a member of the sanitary corps in Cuba, and then in the subsequent Philippine–American War, during the Moro Rebellion from 1903 to 1905. Darrah was also a member of the U.S. Army's Subsistence Department from 1901 to 1905. After his service in the Philippines, Darrah returned to West Point, where he taught chemistry from 1907 to 1911. When the U.S. entered World War I in 1917, Darrah was senior instructor at the Officers' Training Camp at Fort Benjamin Harrison in Indianapolis. He was promoted to colonel of infantry in the National Army and sent to Fort Meade in Maryland to command the 314th Infantry until 1918. On 12 April 1918, Darrah was promoted to brigadier general and went to France. There he commanded the 55th Brigade and took part in major battles, including the Second Battle of the Marne and the Meuse-Argonne Offensive.

After the war, Darrah attended office training schools and then served in various chief-of-staff and command positions. He was chief of staff for the Fourth Corps Area from 1924 to 1926 and then returned to Fort Meade to commanded the 34th Infantry from 1926 to 1928. Darrah returned to the position of chief of staff, this time of the Third Corps Area, until 1931 and then from 1932 to 1934 he commanded the Pacific Section of the Panama Canal Department. Darrah finally retired in 1937 and returned to his home in New York City.

Darrah was awarded with two Silver Star commendations for "gallantry in action" during his services in Santiago, Cuba and Legaspi, Luzon in the Philippines.

== Later career ==
Although retired from the military, during World War II Darrah served as New York State's Deputy Director of Civilian Defense.

== Personal life and death ==
In 1899, Darrah married Rose Wood, they had two daughters: Marion Maxwell and Jean West. He died on 21 January 1955 and was buried in Arlington National Cemetery.
