= Pauwel's angle =

Classification of femoral fracture

Pauwel's angle is the angle between the line of a fracture of the neck of the femur and the horizontal as seen on an anterio-posterior radiograph. Pauwel's angle is named after the German orthopedist Friedrich Pauwels. Introduced in 1935, this system was the first biomechanical classification for femoral neck fractures, and is still in use.

== Clinical Use ==
An increasing angle leads to a more unstable fracture and an increase in the shear stress at the fracture site. This shear leads to higher rates of nonunion.

== Pauwel's Classification ==
Type	Angle
I	<30°
II	>30°/<50°
III	>50°
