= Thompson test =

Medical test

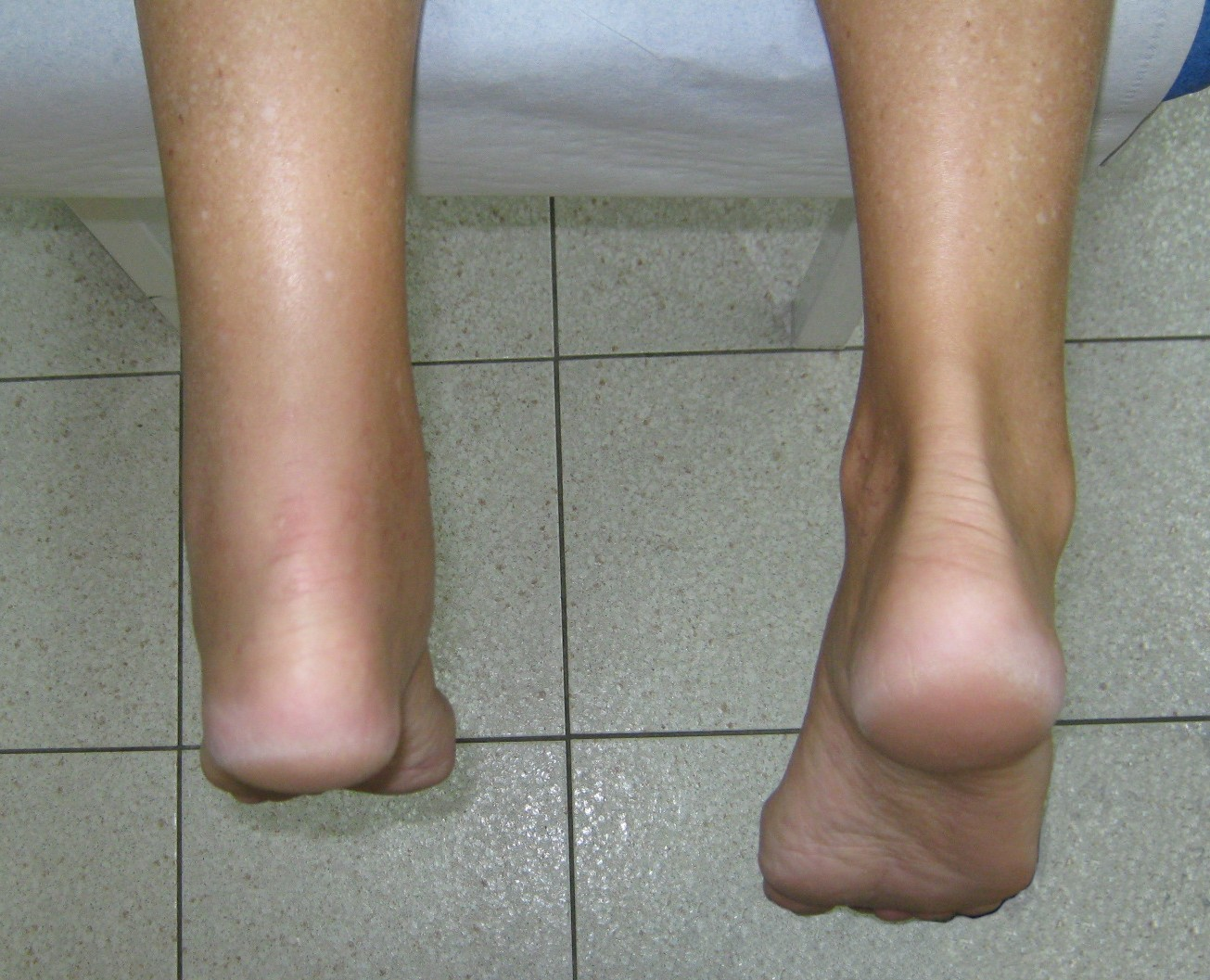
- Left Achilles tendon rupture
- Synonyms: Simmonds' test Simmonds-Thompson test

The Thompson test (also called Simmonds' test or Simmonds-Thompson test) is used in lower limb examination to test for the rupture of the Achilles tendon. The patient lies face down with feet hanging off the edge of the bed. If the test is positive, there is no movement of the foot (normally plantarflexion) on squeezing the corresponding calf, signifying likely rupture of the Achilles tendon.

== Interpretation of results ==
Recent research has indicated that while the test is an accurate detector of achilles rupture, it is unable to distinguish between partial tear (tear of the gastrocnemius or soleal portion only) and a complete tear of both portions.

Complete tear of achilles tendon in ultrasound with Simmonds' test

== History ==
The test is named after Franklin Adin Simmonds (1910-1983), an English orthopaedic surgeon at the Rowley Bristow Hospital, Surrey.
