= American Joint Replacement Registry =

The American Joint Replacement Registry (AJRR) is a non-profit organization established to foster the creation of a national center for data collection, and is dedicated to the improvement in arthroplasty patient care.

== History ==
In partnership with the American Academy of Orthopaedic Surgeons (AAOS), the AJRR was founded in 2009 with the goal of optimizing patient outcomes through the collection of data on all primary and revision total joint replacement procedures in the U.S., while enhancing patient safety, improving quality of care, and reducing the cost for patients. Since then, the AJRR has grown to over 620 participating hospitals with over 400,000 procedures in its database. Both figures are expected to increase by year's end, and will continue to do so as more participants join the registry.

In February 2010, The AAOS ratified the AJRR Board of Directors. In November 2010, AJRR received 501(c)(3) status, and in December 2010, their Business Plan was finalized and approved by the AJRR Board of Directors.

In March 2011, the Pilot Program was initiated, with successful Level I data transmission and collection from pilot sites completed in July of the same year.

In 2012, the national registry software was launched. In August 2012, Jeffrey P. Knezovich, CAE, was hired as AJRR's first Executive Director.

In November 2013, AJRR launched a pilot program of Level II, Level III, and Level IV data collection systems. That pilot study is expected to be concluded by the end of the third quarter of 2014.

In February 2014, the AJRR was named to the National Quality Registry Network (NQRN) Council, an initiative of the American Medical Association; and, in May, 2014, the AJRR was named a Qualified Clinical Data Registry (QCDR) by the Centers for Medicare and Medicaid Services (CMS).

On January 1, 2015, the AJRR officially became a freestanding association. 2015 also marked the formation of the AJRR User Group Network, the merger of the California Joint Replacement Registry (CJRR) into AJRR, and the enrollment of the 600th hospital.
