= Triple arthrodesis =

Surgical procedure

- ICD-9-CM: 81.12

Triple arthrodesis is a surgical procedure whose purpose is to relieve pain in the rear part of the foot, improve stability of the foot, and in some cases correct deformity of the foot, by fusing of the three main joints of the hindfoot: the subtalar joint, calcaneocuboid joint and the talonavicular joint. It is commonly carried out on patients with joint degeneration resulting from arthritis or a severe flat foot deformity.

== See also ==
- Arthrodesis
