= Chalkstick fracture =

- Other names: Carrot stick fractures
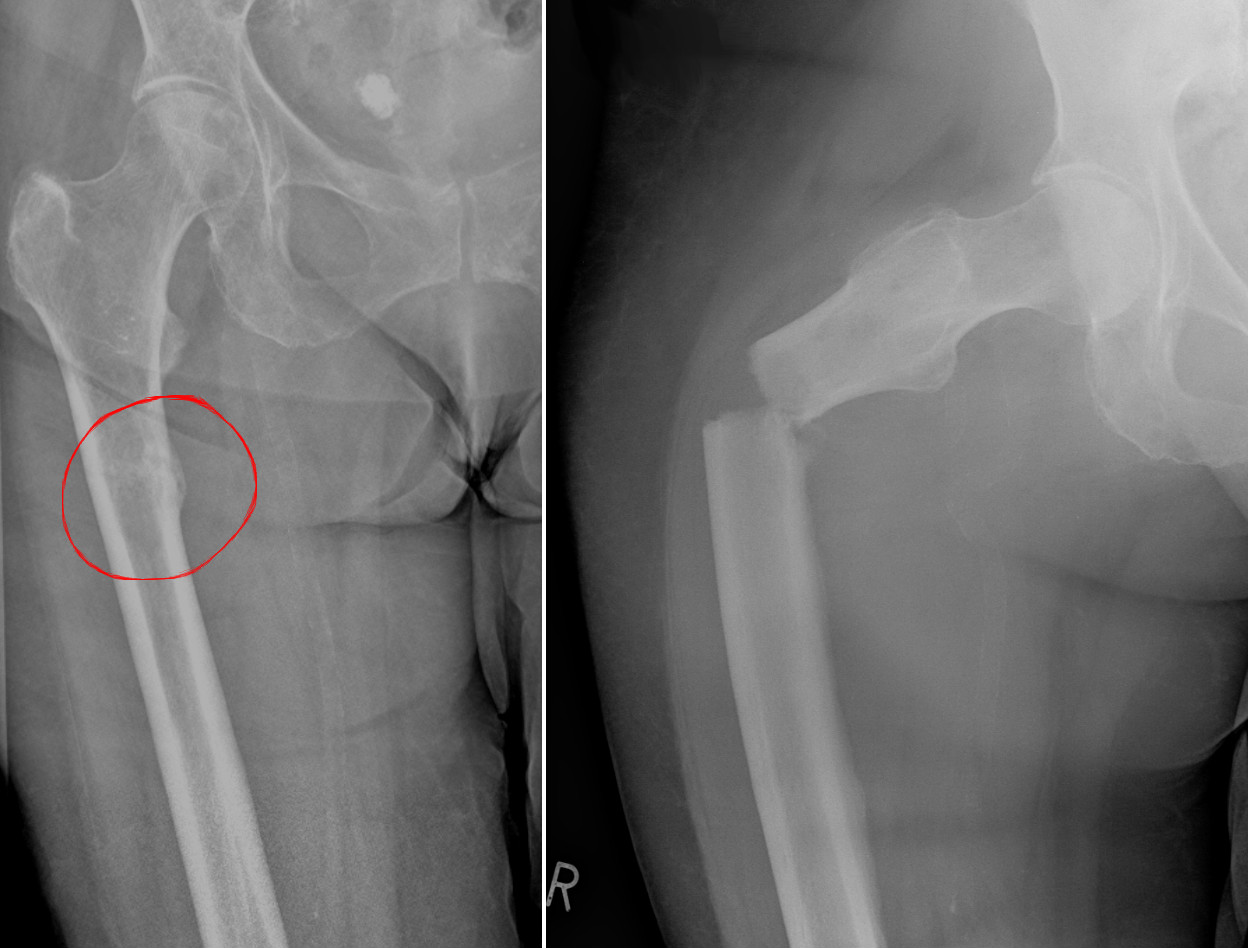
- Chalkstick fracture due to bone metastasis of breast cancer. The left image shows the metastasis, the right a pathological fracture a few days later.
- Specialty: Orthopedics
- Risk factors: Paget's disease of bone, ankylosing spondylitis, and osteopetrosis.

Chalkstick fractures are fractures, typically of long bones, in which the fracture is transverse to the long axis of the bone, like a broken stick of chalk. A healthy long bone typically breaks like a hard woody stick as the collagen in the matrix adds remarkable flexibility to the mineral and the energy can run up and down the growth rings of bone. The bones of children will even follow a greenstick fracture pattern.

Chalkstick fractures are particularly common in Paget's disease of bone, and osteopetrosis. It is also seen in cases of fused spine as in a patient with ankylosing spondylitis.

== Treatment ==
Nonsurgical orthotic management may be appropriate for individuals who have stable fracture patterns as well as no neurological defects. Long-term monitoring is also required to avoid developing a worsening kyphotic deformity. If these patients develop malalignment syndrome, surgical treatment is advised.

Patients with neurological deficits or unstable patterns of fracture require surgical fixation to relieve spinal cord compression and stabilize the injury. A halo brace is another option to manage patients with cervical fractures.
