= Elbow extension test =

Diagnostic test for acute elbow fractures

- Purpose: Assess elbow fractures

The elbow extension test is simple test that can be administered as part of the physical exam to help guide healthcare providers diagnosis and management of acute elbow fractures. The elbow extension test is performed when an elbow fracture, most commonly caused by trauma, is suspected as the source of pain and dysfunction.

== Administering the test ==
The patient is asked to flex the shoulder to ninety degrees. Then, the patient fully extends both arms while supinated. If the patient is unable to extend the dysfunctional arm then a further workup including radiography for acute fracture should be pursued.

== Utility ==
The "Elbow Extension Test", published in the British Medical Journal in December 2008, had a negative predictive value for fracture in 98% of adults and 96% of children in a study done in five separate Emergency Departments in England. In this setting the "Elbow Extension Test" proved useful in ruling out fracture, reducing the number of radiographic tests and reducing the overall cost of care. Follow-up consultation is recommended in any case.

It is up to the clinician and patient’s discretion to decide if more testing is warranted or if a three- to seven-day follow-up appointment or phone consultation to re-evaluate symptoms is sufficient.
