= Osteochondromatosis =

- Specialty: Medical genetics

Osteochondromatosis is a condition involving a proliferation of osteochondromas.

Types include:

- Hereditary multiple exostoses
- Synovial osteochondromatosis
