= Ballottement =

Medical sign

Ballottement is a medical sign which indicates increased fluid in the suprapatellar pouch over the patella at the knee joint. To test ballottement the examiner would apply downward pressure towards the foot with one hand, while pushing the patella backwards against the femur with one finger of the opposite hand. A "milking" motion is used with the downward pressure. If a bogginess around the joint occurs, then the test is positive for ballottement.

Ballottement may also refer to an assessment of an ascitic abdomen. Identifying an organ or a mass in an ascitic abdomen: "Try to ballotte the organ or mass, exemplified here by an enlarged liver. Straighten and stiffen the fingers of one hand together, place them on the abdominal surface, and make a brief jabbing movement directly toward the anticipated structure. This quick movement often displaces the fluid so that your fingertips can briefly touch the surface of the structure through the abdominal wall."
