= Vancouver classification =

Orthopaedic classification system

The Vancouver classification is a grading system used in orthopaedics to determine management of post-operative periprosthetic femoral fractures following a hip arthroplasty. It is named for the city Vancouver, home to the University of British Columbia where the authors of the 1995 paper worked.

== Classification ==
| Type | Description | Treatment |
|---|---|---|
| A | Fracture in the trochanteric region | ORIF if displaced |
| B1 | Fracture around stem or just below, with well fixed stem | ORIF with cables and plate |
| B2 | Fracture around stem or just below, with loose stem but good proximal bone | Revision of femoral component |
| B3 | Fracture around stem or just below, with poor quality or severely comminuted proximal bone | Revision of femoral component with proximal femoral replacement |
| C | Fracture below the prosthesis | ORIF with plate |
