= Upington disease =

- Other names: Perthes-like hip disease, Enchondromata, Ecchondromata, and Familial dyschondroplasia,
- Upington disease has an autosomal dominant pattern of inheritance.
- Specialty: Rheumatology

Upington disease is an extremely rare autosomal dominant malformation disorder. It has only one published source claiming its existence in three generations of one family from South Africa.

== Presentation ==
The disease is characterized by Perthes-like pelvic anomalies (premature closure of the capital femoral epiphyses and widened femoral necks with flattened femoral heads), enchondromata and ecchondromata.

== Genetics ==
Upington disease is inherited in an autosomal dominant manner. This means the defective gene is located on an autosome, and one copy of the defective gene is sufficient to cause the disorder, when inherited from a parent who has the disorder.

== Eponym ==
The name Upington refers to the city in the Northern Cape Province, South Africa, from where the family originates.
