= Eiken syndrome =

- This condition is inherited in an autosomal recessive manner

Eiken syndrome, also known as Eiken skeletal dysplasia, is a rare autosomal bone dysplasia with a skeletal phenotype which has been described in a unique consanguineous family, where it segregates as a recessive trait. First described in 1985, the syndrome primarily affects the development of bones, leading to short stature, long limbs, and joint dislocations. Eiken syndrome is caused by mutations in the PTH1R gene, located on chromosome 3, and is involved in skeletal development.

== Signs and symptoms ==
Delayed ossification characterizes the Eiken syndrome. Individuals with the syndrome may exhibit various orthopedic issues, including abnormal modeling of the bones in the hands and feet, joint hypermobility, abnormal persistence of cartilage in the pelvis, and mild growth retardation.

== Diagnosis ==
Diagnosis often includes clinical evaluation, radiographic imaging, and genetic testing to identify mutations that may be responsible for the syndrome. The disorder typically becomes evident in infancy or early childhood, and its clinical features may vary among affected individuals. The syndrome is very rare, with the seventh patient reported in 2019.
