= Durkan's test =

- Purpose: diagnose carpal tunnel syndrome.

Durkan's test is a medical procedure to diagnose a patient with carpal tunnel syndrome. It is a new variation of Tinel's sign that was proposed by JA Durkan in 1991.

== Process ==
Examiner presses thumbs over carpal tunnel and holds pressure for 30 seconds. An onset of pain or paresthesia in the median nerve distribution within 30 seconds is a positive result of the test.

== Accuracy ==
In studies of diagnostic accuracy, the sensitivity of Durkan's test ranged from 87% to 91% and its specificity from 90% to 95%.

== Comparison ==
Durkan's test is more sensitive than Tinel's sign and Phalen maneuver.
