= Thompson and Epstein classification =

Categorization system for hip fractures

The Thompson and Epstein classification is a system of categorizing posterior fracture/dislocations of the hip.

== Classification ==
Type	Description
I	with or without a minor fracture
II	with a large single fracture of the posterior acetabular rim
III	with comminution of the acetabular ring
IV	with a fracture of the acetabular floor
V	with a fracture of the femoral head

== See also ==
- Acetabular fracture
