= Trevor disease =

- Other names: Dysplasia epiphysealis hemimelica
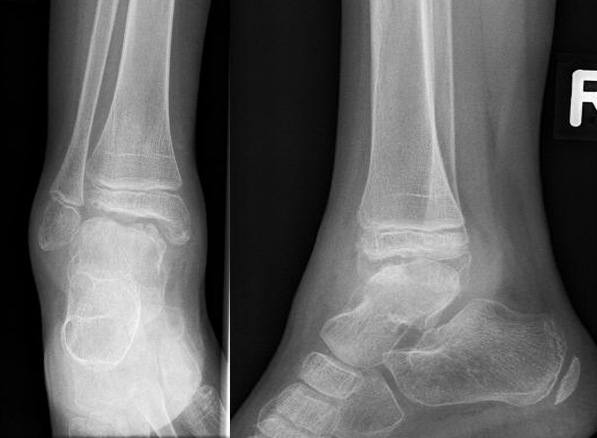
- Trevor disease in a nine-year-old girl: talus
- Specialty: Medical genetics

Trevor disease, also known as dysplasia epiphysealis hemimelica and Trevor's disease, is a congenital bone developmental disorder. There is 1 case per million population. The condition is three times more common in males than in females.

== Presentation ==
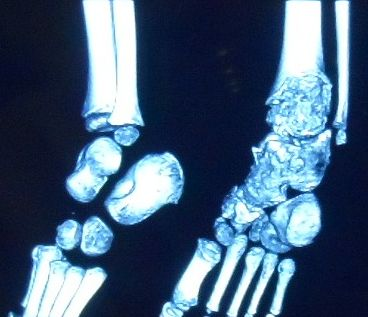
3D CT image of Trevor's disease of the ankle and talus.

This disorder is rare, and is characterised by an asymmetrical limb deformity due to localized overgrowth of cartilage, histologically resembling osteochondroma. It is believed to affect the limb bud in early fetal life. The condition occurs mostly in the ankle or knee region and it is always confined to a single limb. This usually involves only the lower extremities and on medial side of the epiphysis. It is named after researcher David Trevor.

== Diagnosis ==
=== Differential diagnosis ===
Trevor disease can often mimic posttraumatic osseous fragments, synovial chondromatosis, ostechondroma, or anterior spur of ankle. It is not possible to distinguish DEH from osteochondroma on the basis of histopathology alone. Special molecular tests of the genes EXT1, EXT2 are used for the analysis of genetic expressions. These are within normal ranges in DEH, while they are lower in ostechondroma (owing to a mutation). These tests are expensive and the diagnosis is often made on clinical and radiological findings. Synovial chondromatosis occurs in a much older age group and can be ruled out on this basis.

== Treatment ==
Most reported cases of DEH in the literature have been treated surgically, usually with excision of the mass, as well as by the correction of any deformity, while preserving the integrity of the affected joint as much as possible.

== History ==
Trevor disease was first described by the French surgeon Albert Mouchet and J. Belot in 1926. In 1956, the name "dysplasia epiphysealis hemimelica" was proposed by Fairbank. The usual symptoms are the appearance of an osseous protuberance, on one side of the knee, ankle or foot joint which gradually increases radiologically, the condition shows a nonuniformity of growth and multiple unconnected ossification centers around the epiphyses.

== See also ==
- Multiple epiphyseal dysplasia
