= Teunissen–Cremers syndrome =

- Other names: Stapes ankylosis with broad thumbs and toes
- Specialty: Orthopedic

Teunissen–Cremers syndrome is a genetic disorder that presents with skeleton defects some of which can include the bones of the inner ear, fingers and toes. This can result in conductive hearing loss and finger deformities.
