= Ober test =

Physical method to identify tightness of the iliotibial band

- Purpose: identify tightness of the iliotibial band

The Ober test is used in physical examination to identify tightness of the iliotibial band (iliotibial band syndrome). During the test, the patient lies on his/her side with the unaffected leg on the bottom with their shoulder and pelvis in line. The lower hip and knee can be in a flexed position to take out any lordosis of the lumbar spine.

No studies support the validity of the Ober test for measuring iliotibial band tightness.

== Procedure ==
Steps for performing the test

1. With the patient lying in the lateral position, support the knee and flex it to 90 degrees. Then abduct and extend the hip. Then release the knee support. Failure of the knee to adduct is a positive test.
2. The examiner places a stabilizing hand on the patient's upper iliac crest and then lifts the upper leg, is flexed at the knee, extends it at the hip, and slowly lowers it toward the bottom leg, allowing the thigh to lower towards the table. The examiner must continue to stabilize at the hip to ensure there is no movement. The test result is positive if the patient is unable to adduct the leg parallel to the table in a neutral position.
