= Harrison's groove =

- Differential diagnosis: chronic asthma

Harrison's groove, also known as Harrison's sulcus, is a horizontal groove along the lower border of the thorax corresponding to the costal insertion of the diaphragm; it is usually caused by chronic asthma or obstructive respiratory disease. It may also appear in rickets because of defective mineralisation of the bones by calcium necessary to harden them; thus the diaphragm, which is always in tension, pulls the softened bone inward. During rickets it is due to the indentation of lower ribs at the point of attachment of diaphragm.

It is named after Edwin Harrison.
