= Hoffa fracture =

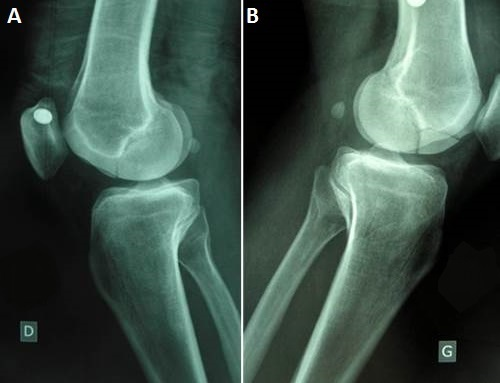
- Medio-lateralradiographsof knees joint showing a bilateral Hoffa fracture of the medial femoral condyle and fracture suspicion of left tibia plateau. (A) right knee; (B) left knee.

A Hoffa fracture is an intra-articular supracondylar distal femoral fracture, characterized by a fracture in the coronal plane. It is named for Albert Hoffa.
