= Denis classification =

System of categorizing sacral fractures

The Denis classification is a system of categorizing sacral fractures.

== Classification ==
Zone	Description
I	Fracture lateral to the sacral foramen
II	Fracture through the sacral foramen
III	Fracture medial to the sacral foramen extending into the spinal canal
