= Gilula's lines =

Diagnostic aid in wrist radiographs

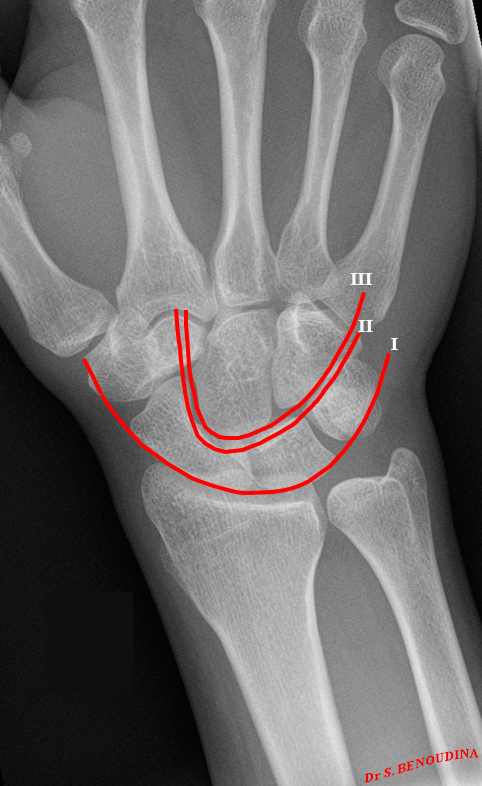
Gilula carpal arcs.

Gilula's lines are three arcs drawn on an AP radiograph of the wrist used to assess the alignment of the carpal bones. They were first described by Louis A. Gilula in 1979.

== Clinical use ==
There should be no step-off in the contour of the lines when drawn on a normal wrist.

First arc	running along the proximal convexity of the scaphoid, lunate and triquetrum
Second arc	running along the distal concavities of the scaphoid, lunate and triquetrum
Third arc	running along the proximal curvatures of the capitate and hamate
