= Hubscher's maneuver =

Method of evaluating the flexibility of a pes planus or flat foot type

- Purpose: evaluating the flexibility of a pes planus

The Hubscher maneuver (or Jack's test) is a method of evaluating the flexibility of a pes planus or flat foot type. The test is performed with the patient weight bearing, with the foot flat on the ground, while the clinician dorsiflexes the hallux and watches for an increasing concavity of the Arches of the foot. A positive result (arch formation) results from the flatfoot being flexible. A negative result (lack of arch formation) results from the flatfoot being rigid. In a Jack's test, the patient raises the rearfoot off the ground, thus passively dorsiflexing the hallux in Closed Kinetic Chain. This will result in an increase of the arch height in cases of Dynamic (Flexible) Flat Foot. If the deformity is a Static (rigid) Flat foot, the height of the arch will be unaffected by raising up the heel on the forefoot.

It is also one method of diagnosing functional hallux limitus. Recent investigations into its reliability have questioned its ability to predict range of motion at the 1st MTP during Gait.
