= Kapandji score =

Clinical test of the thumb

The Kapandji score is a tool useful for assessing the opposition of the thumb, based on where on their hand the patient is able to touch with the tip of their thumb.

== Scoring ==
Score	Location achieved
1	Radial side of the proximal phalanx of the index finger
2	Radial side of the middle phalanx of the index finger
3	Tip of the index finger
4	Tip of the middle finger
5	Tip of the ring finger
6	Tip of the little finger
7	Distal interphalangeal joint crease of the little finger
8	Proximal interphalangeal joint crease of the little finger
9	Metacarpophalangeal joint crease of the little finger
10	Distal palmar crease
