= Herbert classification =

Scaphoid fracture classification system

The Herbert classification is a system of categorizing scaphoid fractures.

== Classification ==
Type	Description		
A	Acute/stable	A1	Tubercle
A	Acute/stable	A2	Nondisplaced waist crack
B	Acute/unstable	B1	Oblique/distal third
B	Acute/unstable	B2	Displaced waist
B	Acute/unstable	B3	Proximal pole
B	Acute/unstable	B4	Fracture dislocation
B	Acute/unstable	B5	Comminuted fracture
C	Delayed union		
D	Established non-union	D1	Fibrous
D	Established non-union	D2	Sclerotic
