= Fairbank's changes =

Radiology

Fairbank's changes describe the radiological changes observed on an AP radiograph of the knee after a meniscectomy.

T. J. Fairbank identified significant changes including squaring of the femoral condyles, peak eminences, ridging, and joint space narrowing.
