= Mirel's score =

Mirels' score is a tool useful in the management of bone tumors, by identifying those patients who would benefit from prophylactic fixation if they have a high enough risk of pathological fracture.

== Scoring ==
A score of 1 to 3 is given for four criteria and summed together. A score greater than 8 suggests prophylactic internal fixation prior to irradiation.

Criteria	Score		
Criteria	1	2	3
Site	Upper limb	Lower limb	Peritrochanteric
Pain	Mild	Moderate	Functional
Lesion	Blastic	Mixed	Lytic
Size	<1/3	1/3-2/3	>2/3
