= Schenck classification =

System of categorizing knee dislocation

The Schenck classification is a system of categorizing knee dislocations based on the pattern of multiligamentous injury. It is limited clinically by not describing the risk of neurovascular involvement.

== Classification ==
Type	Description
I	Single ligament injury (ACL or PCL)
II	Injury to ACL and PCL
III	Injury to ACL, PCL, and either the LCL or MCL
	*KD-III injuries are sub classified as KD-III-M or KD-III-L depending on whether the MCL or LCL/posterolateral corner are injured
IV	Injury to ACL, PCL, LCL and MCL
V	Multiligamentous injury with periarticular fracture
