= Trethowan's sign =

Diagnostic aid in radiographs of the pelvis

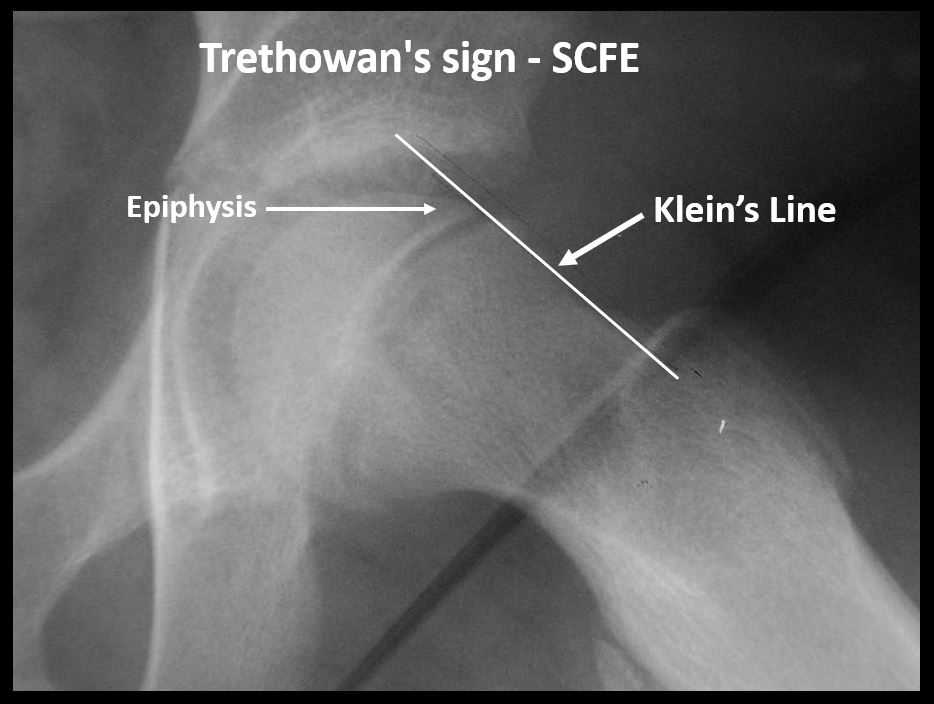

Trethowan's sign is when Klein's line does not intersect the lateral part of the superior femoral epiphysis on an AP radiograph of the pelvis.

== Clinical use ==
Trethowan's sign is indicative of a diagnosis of slipped capital femoral epiphysis.

== See also ==
- Southwick angle
