= Wassel classification =

Polydactyly classification system

The Wassel classification is used to categorise radial polydactyly, based upon the most proximal level of skeletal duplication.

== Classification ==
Type	Level of duplication
I	Distal phalanx
II	Interphalangeal joint
III	Proximal phalanx
IV	Metacarpophalangeal joint
V	Metacarpal
VI	Carpometacarpal joint
VII	Triphalangia
