= Malgaigne's fracture =

Type of pelvic fracture

A Malgaigne fracture is vertical pelvic fracture with bilateral sacroiliac dislocation and fracture of the pubic rami.

It is named for Joseph-François Malgaigne.

== Classification ==
- Tile classification - C3
- Young-Burgess classification - VS
- OTA/AO - 61-C3.1
