= Blumensaat's line =

Line in anatomy

Blumensaat's line is a line which corresponds to the roof of the intercondylar fossa of femur as seen on a lateral radiograph of the knee joint. The angle at which this line appears on the radiograph can be used to determine the position of the patella or diagnose an ACL injury.

== Clinical use ==
On a normal radiograph, the line intersects the inferior pole of the patella, and so can be useful in diagnosing a broken femur as well as a patellar tendon rupture.

It also helps to define the "Schottle point" intra-operatively for reconstruction of the medial patello-femoral ligament (MPFL).

It may also be used to describe the course of an ACL graft.
