= Orthopedic pathology =

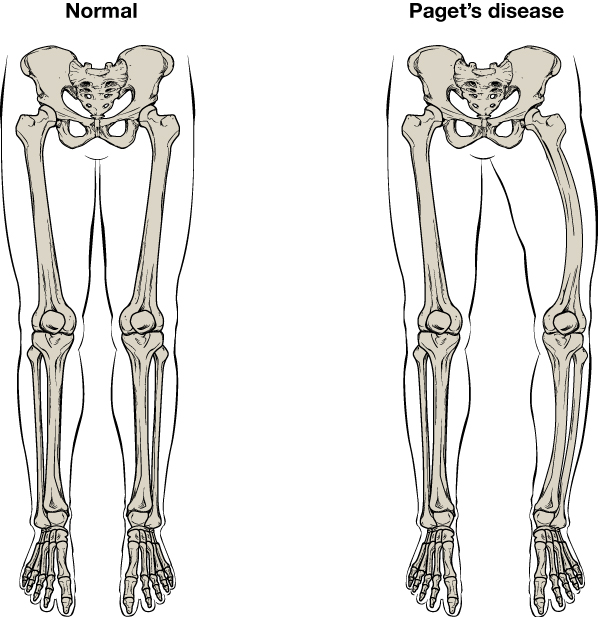
An example of a disease that is identified through orthopaedic pathology: Comparison of the human body normally (left) with one that has Paget's disease of bone in the pelvic area (right). The bones become fragile and deformed over time as a result.

Orthopedic pathology, also known as bone pathology, is a subspecialty of surgical pathology which deals with the diagnosis and feature of many bone diseases, specifically studying the cause and effects of disorders of the musculoskeletal system. It uses gross and microscopic findings along with the findings of in vivo radiological studies, and occasionally, specimen radiographs to diagnose diseases of the bones.

== Causes and effects ==
Orthopaedic disorders may be congenital and there may be hereditary and environmental factors that can affect the normal functioning of the bones, joints, or muscles. Other causes of bone diseases include severe impacts/injuries and weakness in bones/bone loss.

The effects of bone disorders will vary with disease. The effects can occur physically, mentally and financially as well as impact the individuals quality of life. Orthopaedic disorders can drastically affect an individual's functional ability. Individuals who have had bone diseases can experience complications such as extreme pain, fractures, height loss and the ability to be mobile. They can also be more susceptible to other issues, for example, a urinary tract infection (UTI) or pneumonia. Many of these bone disorders could lead to declines in both mental and physical health. In addition to a physical impact, bone disorders can also give rise to psychological ramifications and reflect negatively on an individual's mindset, body image as well as self-esteem, which may result in the individual feeling helpless and yield fears of falling.

To care for bone diseases and disorders is quite expensive. These costs can include both direct and indirect medical expenses as well as possible job loss or productivity loss for the patient. The chances of death vary enormously between the bone disorders due to the differing degree of severity, however many bone diseases do increase an individual's susceptibility to other complications. These disorders depend on multiple factors such as genetics and environmental factors, thus chances range between many individuals.

Individuals are more susceptible to bone fractures as they age with a possibility of more major consequences. This is due to the continual loss of minerals in the bones such as Calcium as well as hormonal changes. Menopause results in mineral loss in bone for women and a slow decline of the production of sex hormones could lead to the development of bone disorders in men, mainly Osteoporosis. The elderly may be more susceptible due to medications they may be taking, worsening in vision as well as decreased ability to use muscle and bones to control balance.

As a common bone disorder, osteoporosis affects a large section of the population, resulting in a reduced quality of life, ill health, a variety of diseases or disabilities and death as a possible consequence. Loss of bone minerals means a decline in bone mass, thus bones will be weaker in some areas resulting in individuals to be at risk of minor or major falls that could be detrimental. It is known that exercise can allow for stronger bones in order to slow down bone loss in individuals as muscle mass can be built to support and reduce the risks of bone disease. Weight and balance training, Aerobic exercise and walking are examples of exercises that can maintain an individual's bone mass. In addition rotational movements in which the bone can be pulled with the muscle are seen to be beneficial. Nutrition and smoking is also very important in the development and prevention of bone diseases.

=== Symptoms ===
Symptoms that patients may experience when bone disorders form can include bone deformities, hip pain, overgrowing of bone in an individual's skull which can result in headaches and a loss of hearing, pain and numbness in arm or legs if the spine is affected and an overall weakness in the body particularly in the hip and knee joints.

=== Treatments ===
Individuals that are diagnosed with bone disorders need to pay attention to secondary causes as medications and the presence of other disorders can also have major effects. Drugs that can prevent bone loss are called antiresorptives. They can slow the degradation of the skeletal system and decrease the risk of subsequent bone injuries fractures. They can help in repairing the individual's bone strength. In addition to antiresorptives, anabolic therapy can also promote the build up of bones and prevent prospective risks. There are also drugs that can deteriorate bone mass. Glucocorticoid is produced naturally by the body itself in the form of cortisol, however it is known that high levels of this hormone both naturally and synthetically can result in a decreased ability for the body to form bone cells, instead amplifying the breaking down of bone minerals. This impacts the bone loss in an individual's body. Other medications that can affect the production of bone cells and enhance bone loss and fractures include breast cancer and prostate cancer drugs, anti-seizure drugs, blood pressure medication, heartburn drugs and diuretics. There are also medical conditions such as neurological disorders, malabsorption, sex hormone deficiency, diabetes, kidney disease and hyperthyroidism that can influence bone disorders.

== Types of Disorders ==
By classifying and understanding the different types of bone diseases, orthopaedic pathologists are able to identify the causes and effects.

=== Bone Cancer/Tumours ===
The two most common forms of bone cancer are Ewing's sarcoma and osteosarcoma. They are highly aggressive pediatric tumours. Ewing sarcoma form in bones or soft tissue, whereas osteosarcoma makes weakened bones at the end of longer ones.

There are multiple other bone cancers that are more rare:

Chondrosarcoma is identified mainly through the production of cartilage from the cells. Depending on the type of chondrosarcoma, it ranges from a slow growth which is able to be removed, to a rapid growth and uncontrollable spread to other parts of the body, known as metastasis.

A Chordoma is another type of cancer that slowly grows into nearby bones and many soft tissues in the spine, ranging from the base of the skull to the tailbone. Chordomas have around a 40% metastasis rate and mainly spread to the lungs.

(rare cases) soft-tissue sarcoma causes:

Undifferentiated pleomorphic sarcoma (UPS) is a form of soft tissue cancer, which mainly targets the arms and legs. It is undifferentiated as under a microscope, the tumour cells appear different to the body cells in which it develops, and is characterised as pleomorphic because it takes many different forms and sizes.

Fibrosarcoma occurs in the fibrous cells that join muscles to bones, most commonly in the arms, legs and pelvis

Sarcoma of Paget's disease of the bone occurs in people that already have Paget's disease, mainly aged above 70. It is very aggressive and difficult to control

Common orthopaedic diseases include; arthritis, back/foot/hand/knee/neck/shoulder pains, osteoporosis, Paget's disease of the bone and soft-tissue injuries.

=== Non-neoplastic disorders ===
Bone diseases include non-neoplastic disorders, which are diseases that are not caused by abnormal growths such as cancer. These consist of genetic diseases, osteoporosis, infections of the bone, and Paget's disease of bone.

=== Neuromotor Impairments ===
Neuromotor impairments refer to the conditions that are established at or before birth in the affected person, regarding damage or unnatural behaviors of the brain and spinal cord, or more generally, the Nervous system. The transmission of specific signals through Neurons by the brain to all parts of the body is hindered by neuromotor impairments, generally causing a range of problems regarding motion and movement of all parts of the body. Common effects are loss of limb functionality, urinary control, and the spinal alignment.

two examples of neuromotor impairments are Cerebral palsy and Spina bifida.

=== Degenerative Diseases ===
Degenerative diseases are classified due to their nature of destroying Motor neurons, responsible for the movement of all muscle groups within the body. Common examples of degenerative diseases are Parkinson's disease and Muscular Dystrophy.

=== Musculoskeletal Disorders ===
Musculoskeletal disorders (or MSDs) are disorders that directly alter the movement and capabilities of the musculoskeletal system or movement of the body. This includes parts such as the muscles, nerves, ligaments, tendons, nerves, etc. These disorders or diseases include Carpal tunnel syndrome, Tendonitis, tedndon/muscle/ligament strains and sprains, Spinal disc herniation, and more.

== Identification Techniques ==
The results from identification techniques help orthopaedic pathologists diagnose the disease.

Commonly used techniques include; Arthrography, blood tests and bone scans, Computed Tomography (CT scans) and intrathecal contrast enhanced CT scans, Doppler ultrasonography, Flexibility/range of motion tests, Radiographs (x-rays) and x-ray Absorptiometry, Magnetic resonance imaging (MRI), muscle tests, physical examinations by observation and Lab studies.

During a Biopsy, depending on the type and location of the tumour, an orthopaedic pathologist will examine the tissue sample removed from the patient and interpret the cells, tissues, and organs to diagnose disease

Image guided biopsies include radiographs (x-rays) and computed tomographies (CT scans). These diagnostic techniques are very common imaging techniques which can detect many injuries and fractures to the bone as well as tumours. There is no definite evidence which states that small amounts of Radiation from these techniques can cause cancer.

These imaging techniques can be used for the diagnosis of bone cancers and tumours, in order to identify the size and location of the tumour. A biopsy may be necessary to confirm the presence of a bone tumour. Fine-needle aspiration is conducted, where a sample of tissue is taken from the tumorous area using a thin needle. It can then be examined under a microscope and analysed by an orthopaedic pathologist. The age of the patient and the location of the tumour are very important considerations in the diagnosis of bone tumours.

== Orthopaedic Pathology: Pets ==
The field of orthopaedic pathology stretches to household pets, mainly in cats and dogs, due to their susceptibility to orthopaedic impairments.

Some common orthopaedic conditions in pets are; Joint problems, fractured (broken bones), Older musculoskeletal injuries, Ruptured ligament, Anterior cruciate ligament injury, Dislocation of the patella and Arthritis.

=== Arthritis ===
Arthritis in pets (and humans) occurs when a joint is inflamed due to the deterioration of lubricants and soft tissue surrounding major joints such as the hips, knees, shoulder and elbows.

==== Common forms of arthritis ====
Osteoarthritis / Degenerative Joint Disease: This is the most common type of arthritis and is a continuous decay of cartilage, caused by friction within the joints through movement.

Septic arthritis / Inflammatory Joint Disease: Septic arthritis is brought upon by infection or an inherited compromised immune system and is seen in the build up of fluid within the joints and an inflammation of cartilage.

Rheumatoid arthritis / Polyarthritis: Polyarthritis is the result of the body's immune system attacking a joint, causing damage to cartilage and tissue.

==== Diagnosis of arthritis ====
A physical test is conducted for signs of the following: Crepitus (grinding/cracking/grating/crunching etc. of joints), rough/deformed bones, Discomfort associated to swelling or tenderness, or Muscle atrophy (Decrease in muscle size).

If required, the following tests may be used;

Radiograph (x-ray) with the animal under Anesthesia and if necessary, a Radiocontrast agent (contrast dye) may be used in the joints before undergoing the test.

Force plate analysis, where a pressure plate on the floor reads the distribution of weight by the dog/cat to detect a favouring of one limb over the others.

Joint fluid aspiration, which is the physical removal of fluid around joints to confirm either degenerative or inflammatory arthritis
