= Cotrel–Dubousset instrumentation =

Treatment approach for scoliosis

- Specialty: Orthopedic

Introduced in 1983, Cotrel–Dubousset Instrumentation is a treatment approach to scoliosis. Unlike Harrington rods, this treatment is more than just an osteodistraction mechanism and allows correction of some of the features of scoliosis untreatable by Harrington rods, such as rib hump.
