= Larrey's sign =

- Differential diagnosis: Sacroiliitis

Larrey's sign is a clinical sign in which patients with sacroiliitis experience pain in the sacroiliac area of the lower back on sitting down suddenly on a hard chair.

The sign is named after Dominique Larrey.
