= Milch classification =

Humerus fracture classification system

The Milch classification is a system of categorizing single column (AO type B) distal humerus fractures based on the pattern of epicondyle involvement. It is distinct from the Jupiter classification which is used for bicolumnar distal humerus fractures.

== Classification ==
Type	Description
I	Lateral trochlear ridge intact
II	Fracture through lateral trochlear ridge
