= Bryant's traction =

Orthopedic intervention

Bryant's traction is a form of orthopedic traction. It is mainly used in young children who have fractures of the femur or congenital abnormalities of the hip. Both the patient's limbs are suspended in the air vertically at a ninety degree angle from the hips and knees slightly flexed. Over a period of days, the hips are gradually moved outward from the body using a pulley system. The patient's body provides the counter-traction.
