= Martin–Gruber anastomosis =

A Martin–Gruber anastomosis (MGA) is a connection from the median nerve to the ulnar nerve in the forearm. An anastomosis occurs when two structures that normally are not connected have a connection. In this case the connection is a nerve. The Martin–Gruber anastomosis is most common anastomosis that occurs between these two nerves. This connection carries motor axons which innervate some of the usually ulnar nerve innervated intrinsic muscles.

This inconstant pattern of connection can serve as explanation for a difficult or challenging differential diagnosis. In one study, the MGA was found in 22.9% of cadaver specimens, while another found the incidence at ~11%. This relatively high incidence demonstrates the necessity for healthcare specialists to factor the MGA into their diagnoses.

== Types ==
There are six types of Martin-Gruber anastomoses.

== Clinical significance ==
In the setting of proximal ulnar nerve injury, a Martin-Gruber anastomosis can prevent the complete paralysis of the intrinsic muscles of the hand.

== History ==
The Martin–Gruber anastomosis is named after Swedish physician Roland Martin and Austrian anatomist Wenzel Gruber, who described it independently in 1763 and 1870 respectively.
