= Haraguchi classification =

Method to classify an ankle fracture

The Haraguchi classification is a system of categorizing posterior malleolus fractures.

== Classification ==
Type	Description
I	Posterolateral-oblique type
II	Medial-extension type
III	Small-shell type
