= Teisen classification =

Lunate bone fracture classification system

Teisen classification is a system of categorizing fractures of the lunate bone, which is located in the hand.

== Classification ==
Type	Description
I	Volar pole fracture
II	Chip fracture not affecting the blood supply
III	Fracture of dorsal pole
IV	Sagittal fracture through the body
V	Transverse fracture through the body
