= Hip prosthesis zones =

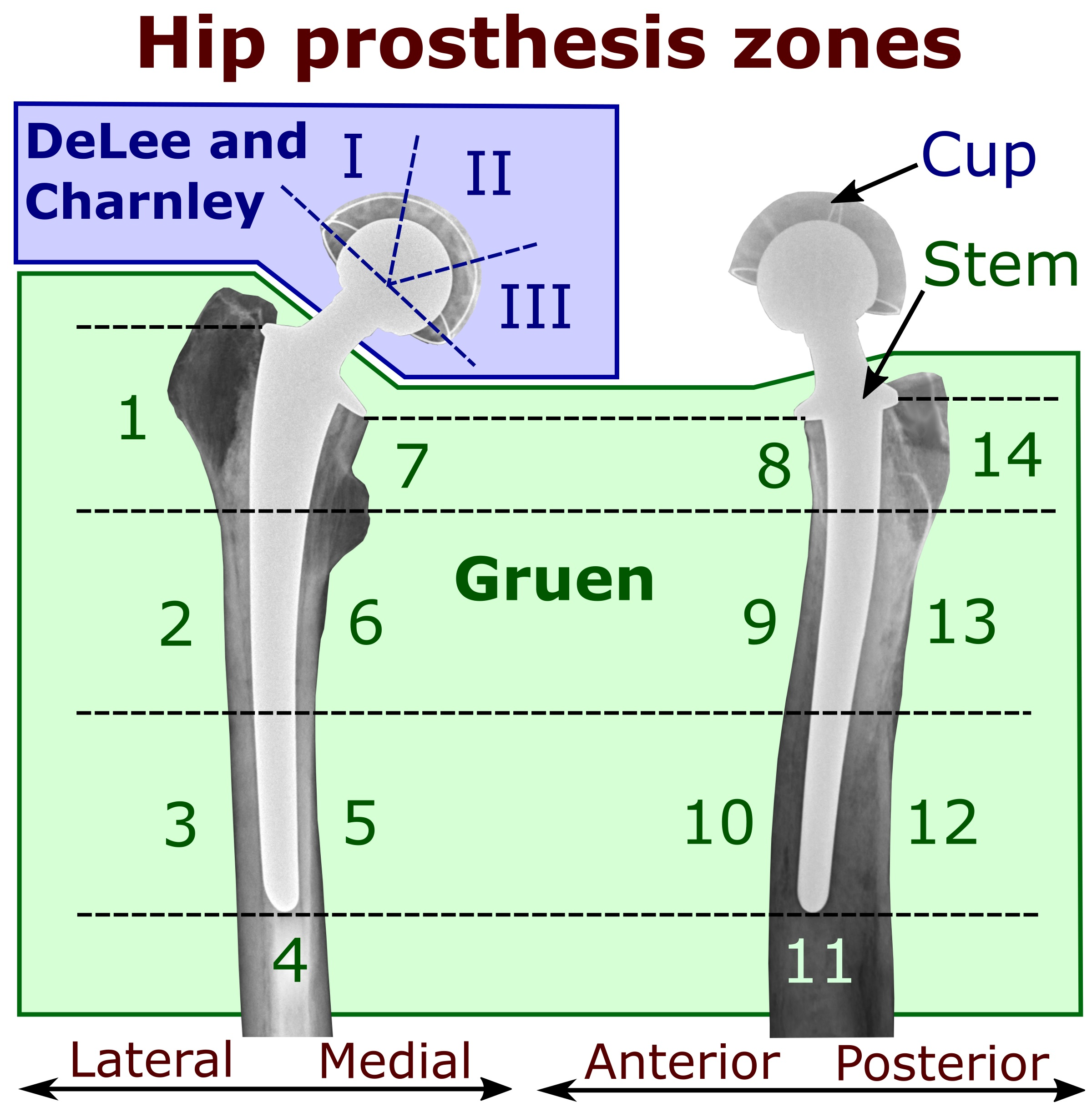
Zones of a hip prosthesis, by the DeLee and Charnley system, and the Gruen system.

After hip replacement, hip prosthesis zones are regions in the interface between prosthesis material and the surrounding bone. These are used as reference regions when describing for example complications including hip prosthesis loosening on medical imaging. Postoperative controls after hip replacement surgery is routinely done by projectional radiography in anteroposterior and lateral views.

== DeLee and Charnley ==
The DeLee and Charnley system applies to the acetabular cup on anteroposterior radiographs. It divides the acetabulum into three equally large zones.

== Gruen ==
The Gruen zones is a system of dividing the interface between the bone and the stem of the hip prosthesis.

Zone	Description
I	Greater trochanter
II	
III	
IV	Distal to tip
V	
VI	
VII	Lesser trochanter
