= Juvenile osteoporosis =

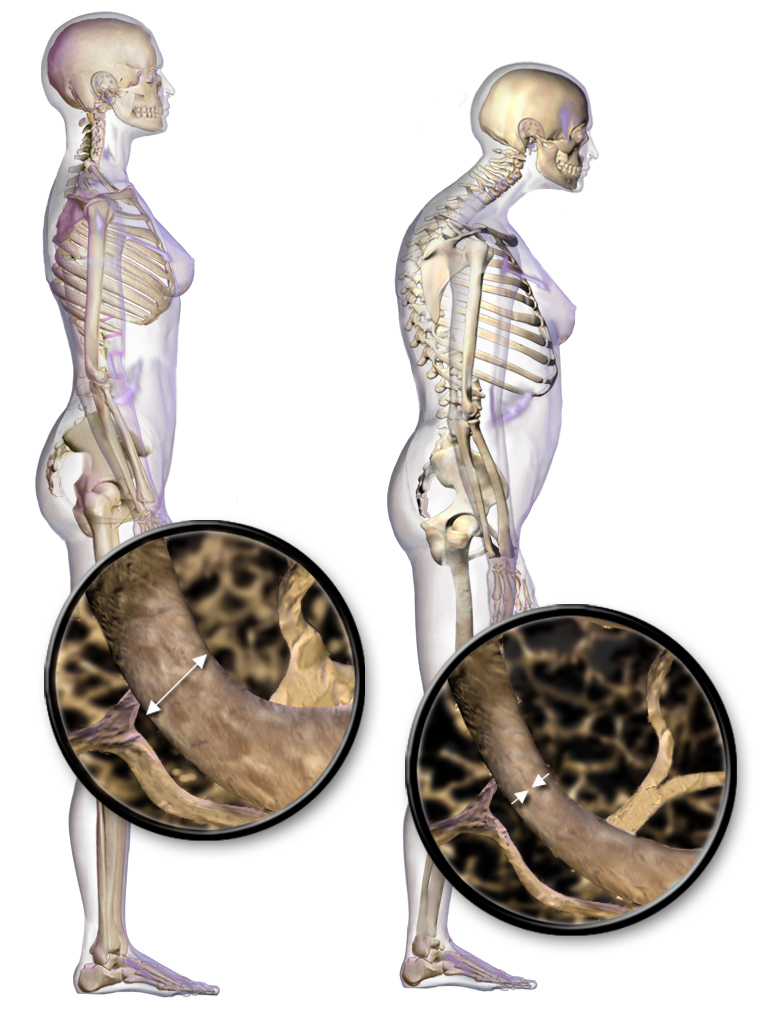
- Osteoporosis
- Specialty: Rheumatology

Juvenile osteoporosis is osteoporosis in children and adolescents. Osteoporosis is rare in children and adolescents. When it occurs, it is usually secondary to some other condition, e.g. osteogenesis imperfecta, rickets, eating disorders or arthritis. In some cases, there is no known cause and it is called idiopathic juvenile osteoporosis. Idiopathic juvenile osteoporosis usually goes away spontaneously.

Also, child abuse should be suspected in recurring cases of bone fracture.

== Cause ==
The causes of juvenile osteoporosis may be genetic, environmental, or indeterminate.

== Diagnosis ==
Diagnosis is made by a physician, who will utilize several tests and procedures to make the diagnosis.

== Treatment ==
Treatment for secondary juvenile osteoporosis focuses on treating any underlying disorder. Treatment of Juvenile osteoporosis can also include maintaining a healthy lifestyle. This is accomplished by exercising, keeping a balanced diet of proper food and drinks, as well as keeping your body full of the necessary vitamins. If needed, Juvenile osteoporosis can also be treated by undergoing physical therapy.
