= Seinsheimer classification =

The Seinsheimer classification is a system of categorizing subtrochanteric hip fractures based on the fracture pattern of the proximal femoral shaft. The classification was developed by Frank Seinsheimer III in 1978. In the published work, fifty-six patients were treated for subtrochanteric fractures, and their fractures were "classified according to the number of major fragments and the locations and shapes of the fracture lines." This system of classification was used to assess the correlation between type of fracture and success of treatment.

A later study of 50 subtrochanteric fractures, which were assessed using the Seinsheimer classification, criticized the classification system for having poor inter-rater reliability. They noted that "Earlier studies of pertrochanteric [sic] and femoral neck fractures show that the use of classification systems is often difficult, with low agreement (Frandsen et al. 1988, Andersen et al. 1990, Gehrchen et al. 1993). The results of these studies accord with the low level of interobserver agreement in our study. A total agreement of 26% or at the best 60% is not acceptable." A further study published in 2014 assessed four subtrochanteric fracture classification systems, including the Seinsheimer system, and concluded that "the four subtrochanteric classification systems which we assessed were not found to be sufficiently reproducible to be of any significant value in clinical practice."

== Classification ==
Type		Description
I		less than 2mm displacement
II	A	2-part transverse fracture
II	B	2-part spiral fracture with lesser trochanter attached to the proximal fragment
II	C	2-part spiral fracture with lesser trochanter attached to the distal fragment
III	A	3-part spiral fracture with lesser trochanter as separate fragment
III	B	3-part spiral fracture with butterfly fragment
IV		Comminuted fracture with 4 or more fragments
V		Fracture with proximal extension into the greater trochanter

== See also ==
- Femoral fracture
