= Destot's sign =

- Differential diagnosis: pelvic fracture

Destot's sign (English: /dɛˈstoʊ/ deh-STOH, French: [desto]) is a clinical sign in which a superficial haematoma is seen above the inguinal ligament in the groin, over the scrotum or perineum, or in the upper thigh. It can occur in patients with pelvic fracture.
