= Evans–Jensen classification =

System of categorizing hip fractures

The Evans–Jensen classification is a system of categorizing intertrochanteric hip fractures based on the fracture pattern of the proximal femur.

== Classification ==
| Type | | Description |
|---|---|---|
| I | A | 2-part non-displaced |
| I | B | 2-part displaced |
| II | A | 3-part fracture with separate greater trochanter fragment |
| II | B | 3-part fracture with separate lesser trochanter fragment |
| III | | 4-part fracture |

== See also ==
- Femoral fracture
