= Mayfield classification =

Categorization of wrist injuries

The Mayfield classification is a system of categorizing perilunate dislocations.

== Classification ==
Stage	Description
I	Scapholunate dissociation
II	Lunocapitate disruption
III	Lunotriquetral disruption
IV	Lunate dislocation
