= Jobe's test =

Medical diagnosis

- Purpose: Diagnose shoulder instability
- Test of: Shoulder joint

Jobe's test, also known as the empty can test, is an orthopedic examination used to test stability of the shoulder.

== Purpose ==
The purpose of this test is to determine instability for the shoulder. This test should be performed bilaterally to compare stability of both right and left shoulder joints.

== Procedure ==
The patient is to lie supine on the table. They are to place their shoulder at 90° abduction. The elbow should be flexed at 90°. The examiner should stand beside the patient with their distal hand holding the patient's wrist and hand. The examiner's proximal hand is to be placed over the patient's humeral head. The examiner applies a posterior force to the humeral head and externally rotates the patients humerus.

== Mechanism ==
The examiner applies a posterior force to the humeral head and externally rotates the patients humerus.

== Results ==
A decrease in pain or apprehension or an increase in range of motion is a positive sign for anterior instability. Anterior pain may be caused by laxity in anterior ligaments or capsular structures or a tear of the labrum. Posterior pain may be caused from internal impingement of the posterior capsular or labrum.

== History ==
Jobe's test is a physical exam test that is used to detect anterior shoulder instability. It is used to distinguish between anterior instability and primary shoulder impingement. This test should be performed after the Apprehension test. This test was named for Christopher Jobe.
