= Akin osteotomy =

Surgery to correct hallux valgus

Illustration showing Akin osteotomy correction of the big toe

Akin osteotomy is a surgical procedure often used in the treatment of hallux valgus deformity, more commonly known as a bunion. A bunion is a bony bump that forms on the joint at the base of the big toe, often resulting in the toe pointing abnormally toward the second toe. Akin osteotomy is usually performed in conjunction with other procedures (such as the Chevron procedure) to correct the alignment of the toe and relieve associated symptoms. This procedure was first described by Akin in 1925.

== Indications ==
Akin osteotomy is indicated for patients with hallux valgus deformity, particularly when there is:

- Angular deformity of the big toe
- Pain and discomfort associated with the bunion
- Difficulty fitting into shoes due to the deformity
- Failure of conservative treatment methods such as orthotics or footwear modifications

== Operative procedure ==
The surgery is often performed under local anaesthesia. Through a small incision made on the medial side of the big toe, a wedge-shaped piece of the bone is removed from the proximal phalanx. The toe is then realigned to its correct position and secured using pins, screws or a plate.
