= Ideberg classification =

Scapula fracture classification system

The Ideberg classification is a system of categorizing scapula fractures involving the glenoid fossa.

== Classification ==
Type	Description
Ia	Anterior rim fracture
Ib	Posterior rim fracture
II	Fracture through glenoid exiting scapula laterally
III	Fracture through glenoid exiting scapula superiorly
IV	Fracture through glenoid exiting scapula medially
Va	Combination of types II and IV
Vb	Combination of types III and IV
Vc	Combination of types II, III and IV
VI	Severe comminution
