= Galeazzi test =

- Purpose: assess hip dislocation

The Galeazzi test, also known as the Allis sign, is used to assess for hip dislocation, primarily in order to test for developmental dysplasia of the hip. It is performed by flexing an infant's knees when they are lying down so that the feet touch the surface and the ankles touch the buttocks. If the knees are not level then the test is positive, indicating a potential congenital hip malformation.
