= Yergason's test =

Orthopedic examination test

- Purpose: examination of the shoulder

Yergason's test is a special test used for orthopedic examination of the shoulder and upper arm region, specifically the biceps tendon.

== Purpose ==
It identifies the presence of a pathology involving the biceps tendon or glenoid labrum. The specific positive findings to the test include pain in the bicipital groove indicating biceps tendinitis, subluxation of the long head of the biceps brachii muscle, and presence of a SLAP tear.

== Procedure ==
Palpating the biceps tendon as it passes through the bicipital groove to identify any lesions, abnormal bumps, or abnormal movement (i.e. biceps tendon) in the involved area.

== Mechanism ==
To perform the test, the examiner must stand on the affected side of the patient. The patient needs to be in a seated position with the elbow flexed to 90°, forearm pronated (palm facing the ground), and the arm stabilized against the thorax. The examiner places the stabilizing hand on the proximal portion of the humerus near the bicipital groove, and the resistance hand on the distal forearm and wrist.

The patient is instructed to actively supinate the forearm, externally rotate the humerus, and flex the elbow against the resistance of the examiner. Referred pain by the patient results in one of positive findings.

- Modification involves the examiner resisting elbow flexion as the humerus moves into external rotation.

== Results ==
Biceps tendinitis or subluxation of the biceps tendon can normally be addressed by palpating the long head of the biceps tendon in the bicipital groove. The patient will exhibit a pain response, snapping or both in the bicipital groove. Pain with no associated popping might indicate bicipital tendinopathy. A snapping indicates a tear or laxity of the transverse humeral ligament, which would prevent the ligament from securing the tendon in the groove. Pain at the superior glenohumeral joint is indicative of a SLAP tear.

== Adverse effects ==
This is a difficult test to perform for an accurate diagnosis. False positive findings can be the result of a rotator cuff tear, while pain in the superior glenohumeral region is a weak predictor of a SLAP tear.

== See also ==
Here are a list of anatomical terms with their associated links that are used in this article.

- Proximal and distal
- Superior and inferior
- Pronate
- Supinate
- External rotation
- Flexion
