= Darrach's procedure =

Darrah procedure
- Other names: Distal ulna resection
- Specialty: Orthopedic

Darrach's procedure or distal ulna resection is a surgical technique for the surgical removal of the head of ulna. It is performed in cases of radial–ulnar joint pain and instability. The styloid process and muscular attachments are left intact. Weakness and instability can develop after the procedure. It is most appropriate for elderly patients with low physical demands.
