= Orthopedic surgery =

Surgery on the musculoskeletal system

Orthopedic
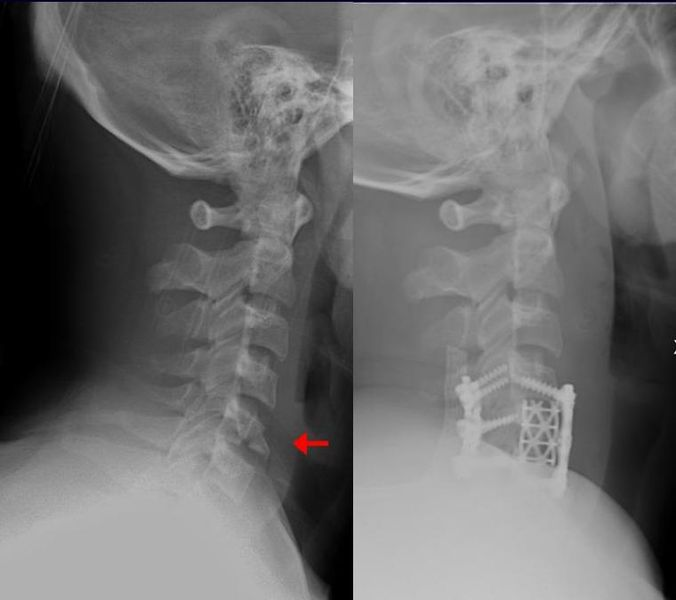
- A fracture of the lower cervical vertebrae, one of the conditions treated by orthopedic surgeons and neurosurgeons
- MeSH: D019637

Occupation
- Names: Physician; Surgeon
- Occupation type: Specialty
- Activity sectors: Medicine, Surgery

Description
- Education required: Bachelor of Medicine, Bachelor of Surgery (M.B.B.S.); Bachelor of Medicine, Bachelor of Surgery (MBChB); Doctor of Medicine (M.D.); Doctor of Osteopathic Medicine (D.O.)
- Fields of employment: Hospitals, Clinics

Orthopedic surgery or orthopedics (alternative spelling orthopaedics) is the branch of surgery concerned with conditions involving the musculoskeletal system. Orthopedic surgeons use both surgical and nonsurgical means to treat musculoskeletal trauma, spine diseases, sports injuries, degenerative diseases, infections, tumors and congenital disorders.

== Etymology ==
Nicolas Andry coined the word in French as orthopédie, derived from the Ancient Greek words ὀρθός orthos ("correct", "straight") and παιδίον paidion ("child"), and published Orthopedie (translated as Orthopædia: Or the Art of Correcting and Preventing Deformities in Children) in 1741. The word was assimilated into English as orthopædics; the ligature æ was common in that era for ae in Greek- and Latin-based words.

As the name implies, the discipline was initially developed with attention to children, but the correction of spinal and bone deformities in all stages of life eventually became the cornerstone of orthopedic practice.

=== Differences in spelling ===
As with many words derived with the "æ" ligature, simplification to either "ae" or just "e" is common, especially in North America. In the US, the majority of college, university, and residency programmes, and even the American Academy of Orthopaedic Surgeons, still use the spelling with the digraph ae, though hospitals usually use the shortened form. Elsewhere, usage is not uniform; in Canada, both spellings are acceptable; "orthopaedics" is the normal spelling in the UK in line with other fields which retain "ae".

== History ==
=== Early orthopedics ===
Many developments in orthopedic surgery have resulted from experiences during wartime. On the battlefields of the Middle Ages, the injured were treated with bandages soaked in horses' blood, which dried to form a stiff, if unsanitary, splint.

Originally, the term orthopedics meant the correcting of musculoskeletal deformities in children. Nicolas Andry, a professor of medicine at the University of Paris, coined the term in the first textbook written on the subject in 1741. He advocated the use of exercise, manipulation, and splinting to treat deformities in children. His book was directed towards parents, and while some topics would be familiar to orthopedists today, it also included 'excessive sweating of the palms' and freckles.

Jean-André Venel established the first orthopedic institute in 1780, which was the first hospital dedicated to the treatment of children's skeletal deformities. He developed the club-foot shoe for children born with foot deformities and various methods to treat curvature of the spine.

Advances made in surgical technique during the 18th century, such as John Hunter's research on tendon healing and Percivall Pott's work on spinal deformity steadily increased the range of new methods available for effective treatment. Robert Chessher, a pioneering British orthopedist, invented the double-inclined plane, used to treat lower-body bone fractures, in 1790. Antonius Mathijsen, a Dutch military surgeon, invented the plaster of Paris cast in 1851. Until the 1890s, though, orthopedics was still a study limited to the correction of deformity in children. One of the first surgical procedures developed was percutaneous tenotomy. This involved cutting a tendon, originally the Achilles tendon, to help treat deformities alongside bracing and exercises. In the late 1800s and first decades of the 1900s, significant controversy arose about whether orthopedics should include surgical procedures at all.

=== Modern orthopedics ===
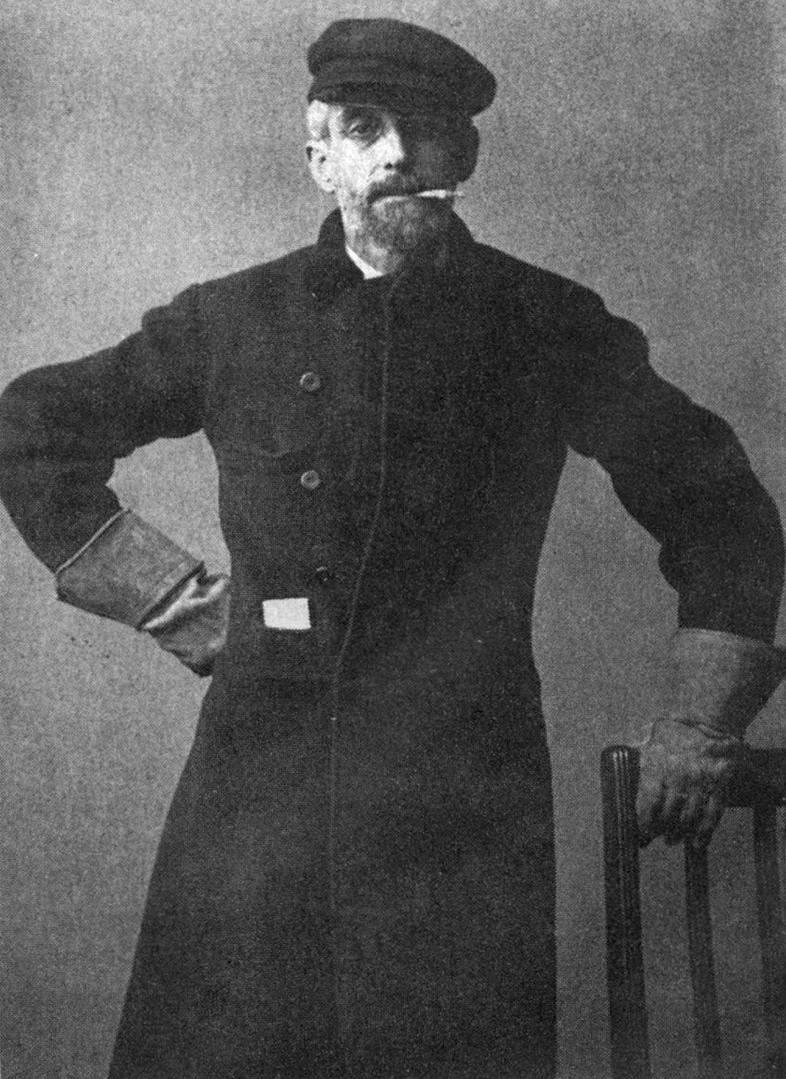
Hugh Owen Thomas, a pioneer of modern orthopedic surgery

In 1887, the Hospital for Special Surgery founded the first orthopedic residency program in the United States. Young doctors in training would apply for one-year positions as assistant. They became known as residents, a term recognized as a doctor in training.

Examples of people who aided the development of modern orthopedic surgery were Hugh Owen Thomas, a surgeon from Wales, and his nephew, Robert Jones. Thomas became interested in orthopedics and bone-setting after establishing his own practice, expanding the field into the general treatment of fracture and other musculoskeletal problems. Thomas's collar to treat tuberculosis of the cervical spine, Thomas's maneuvere for assessing hip fracture, and the Thomas test are procedures credited to his innovations.

Robert Jones was surgeon-superintendent for the construction of the Manchester Ship Canal in 1888. He was responsible for the injured among the 20,000 workers, and he organized the first comprehensive accident service in the world.

He personally managed 3,000 cases and performed 300 operations in his own hospital. This position enabled him to learn new techniques and improve the standard of fracture management. Physicians from around the world came to Jones' clinic to learn his techniques. Along with Alfred Tubby, Jones founded the British Orthopaedic Association in 1894.

During the First World War, Jones served as a Territorial Army surgeon. He observed that treatment of fractures both at the front and in hospitals at home was inadequate, and his efforts led to the introduction of military orthopedic hospitals from 1916 to 1918.

The use of intramedullary rods to treat fractures of the femur and tibia was pioneered by Gerhard Küntscher of Germany. Traction was the standard method of treating thigh bone fractures until the late 1970s, though, when intramedullary fixation without opening up the fracture became a standard procedure.

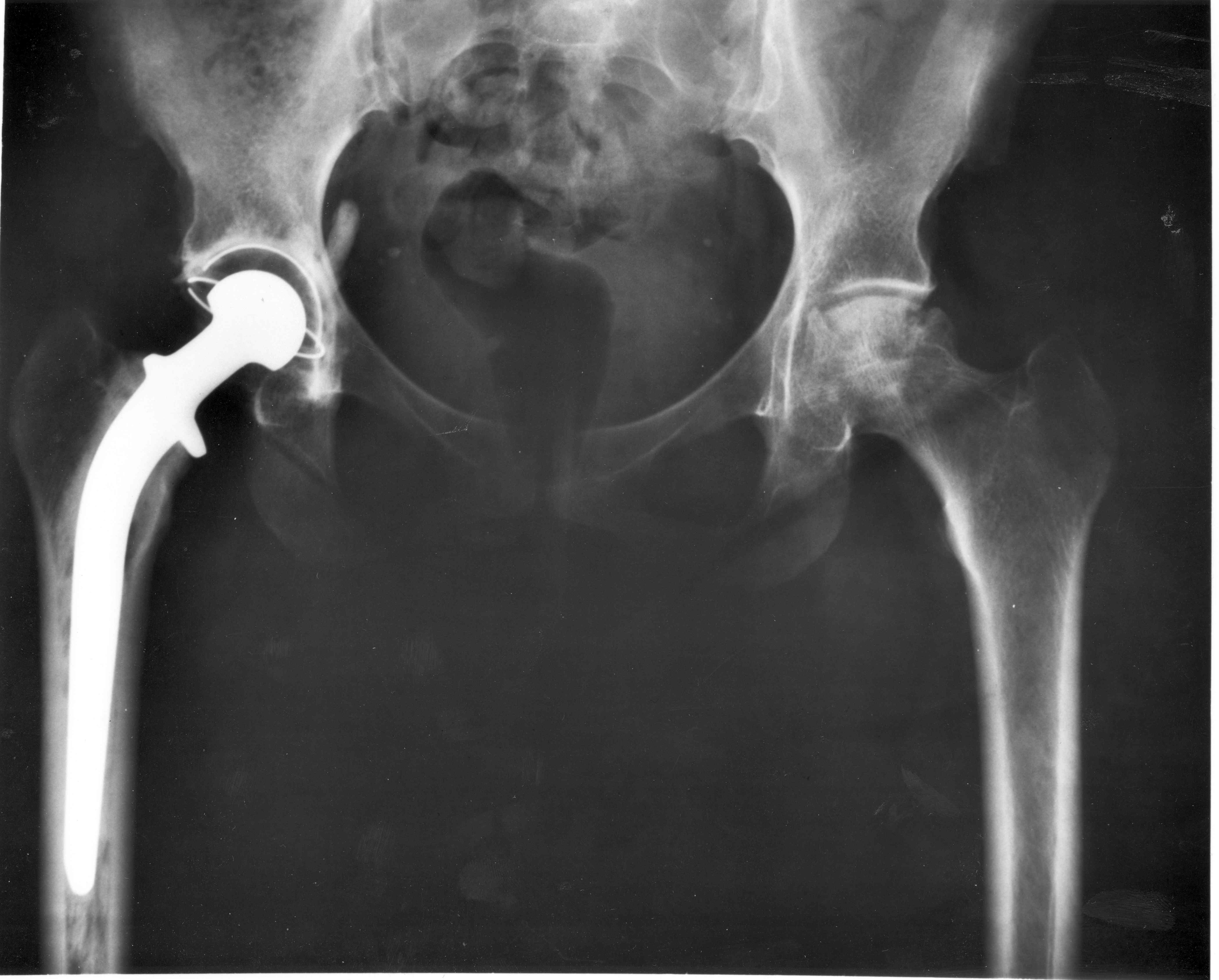
X-ray of a hip replacement

The modern total hip replacement was pioneered by Sir John Charnley in England in the 1960s. He found that joint surfaces could be replaced by implants cemented to the bone. His design consisted of a stainless steel, one-piece femoral stem and head, and a polyethylene acetabular component, both of which were fixed to the bone using poly(methyl methacrylate) (acrylic) bone cement. For over two decades, the Charnley low-friction arthroplasty and its derivative designs were the most-used systems in the world, forming the basis for all modern hip implants.

The Exeter hip replacement system (with a slightly different stem geometry) was developed at the same time. Since Charnley, improvements have been continuous in the design and technique of joint replacement (arthroplasty) with many contributors.

Knee replacements for osteoarthritis were developed in the 1970s using a fixed bearing system and a mobile bearing system. In 1974, a total condylar knee replacement was produced.

External fixation of fractures was refined by American surgeons during the Vietnam War, but a major contribution was made by Gavriil Ilizarov who achieved healing, realignment, and lengthening to a substantial degree, including the Ilizarov apparatus.

== Training ==
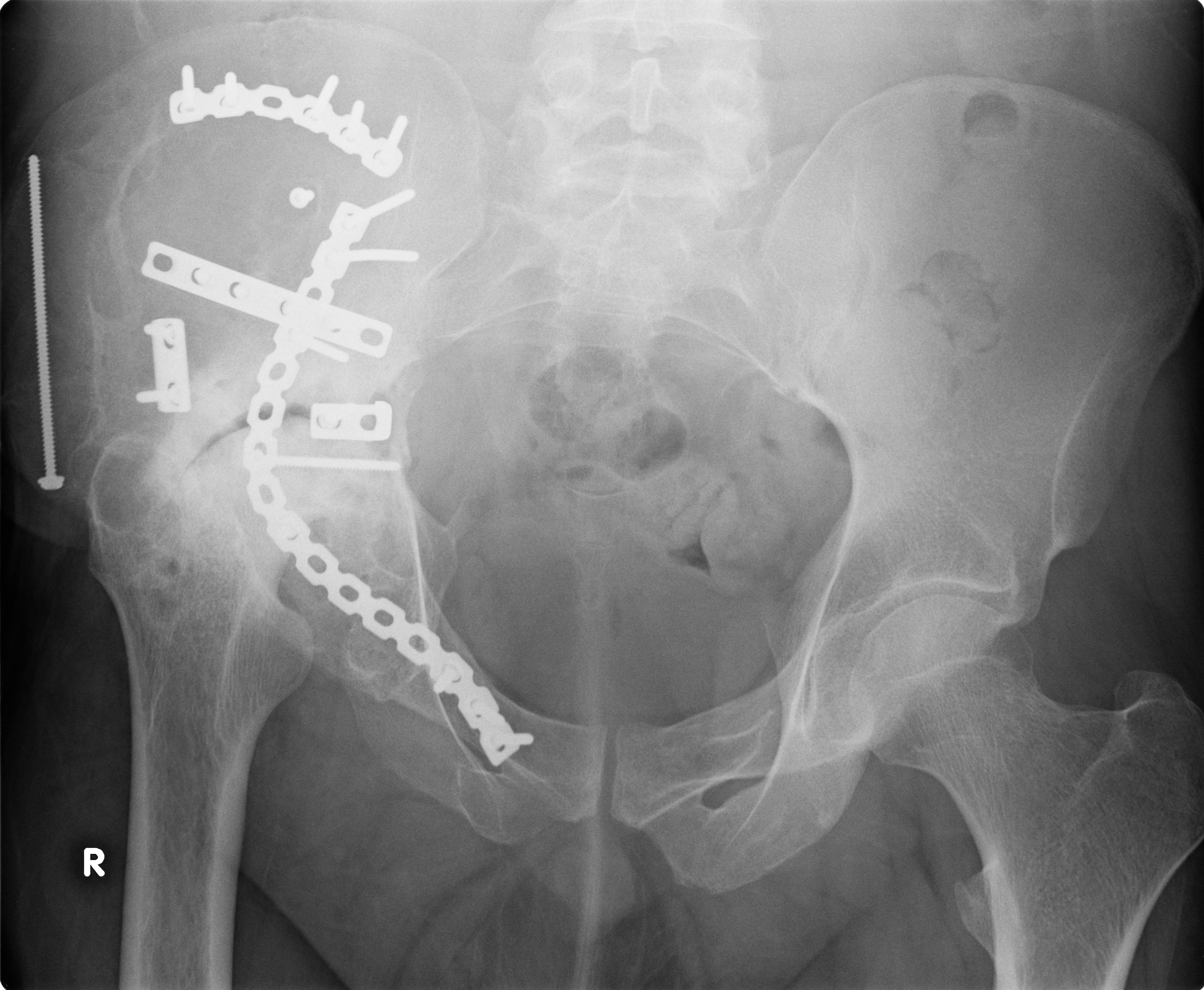
This image, taken in September 2006, shows extensive repair work to the right acetabulum six years after it was carried out (2000). The onset of arthritis, a bone/joint disease, has made further joint damage visible.

In the United States, orthopedic surgeons have typically completed four years of undergraduate education and four years of medical school and earned either a Doctor of Medicine (MD) or Doctor of Osteopathic Medicine (DO) degree. Subsequently, these medical school graduates undergo residency training in orthopedic surgery. The five-year residency is a categorical orthopedic surgery training.

Selection for residency training in orthopedic surgery is very competitive. Roughly 700 physicians complete orthopedic residency training per year in the United States. About 10% of current orthopedic surgery residents are women; about 20% are members of minority groups. Around 20,400 actively practicing orthopedic surgeons and residents are in the United States. According to the latest Occupational Outlook Handbook (2011–2012) published by the United States Department of Labor, 3–4% of all practicing physicians are orthopedic surgeons.

Many orthopedic surgeons elect to do further training, or fellowships, after completing their residency training. Fellowship training in an orthopedic sub-specialty is typically one year in duration (sometimes two) and sometimes has a research component involved with the clinical and operative training. Examples of orthopedic subspecialty training in the United States are:

- Foot and ankle surgery
- Hand and upper extremities
- Hip and knee surgery
- Orthopedic oncologist
- Orthopedic trauma
- Osseointegration
- Pediatric orthopedics
- Shoulder and elbow
- Spine surgery
- Surgical sports medicine
- Total joint reconstruction (arthroplasty)

These specialized areas of medicine are not exclusive to orthopedic surgery. For example, hand surgery is practiced by some plastic surgeons, and spine surgery is practiced by most neurosurgeons. Additionally, foot and ankle surgery is also practiced by doctors of podiatric medicine (DPM) in the United States. Some family practice physicians practice sports medicine, but their scope of practice is nonoperative.

After completion of specialty residency or registrar training, an orthopedic surgeon is then eligible for board certification by the American Board of Medical Specialties or the American Osteopathic Association Bureau of Osteopathic Specialists. Certification by the American Board of Orthopedic Surgery or the American Osteopathic Board of Orthopedic Surgery means that the orthopedic surgeon has met the specified educational, evaluation, and examination requirements of the board. The process requires successful completion of a standardized written examination followed by an oral examination focused on the surgeon's clinical and surgical performance over a 6-month period. In Canada, the certifying organization is the Royal College of Physicians and Surgeons of Canada; in Australia and New Zealand, it is the Royal Australasian College of Surgeons.

In the United States, specialists in hand surgery and orthopedic sports medicine may obtain a certificate of added qualifications in addition to their board primary certification by successfully completing a separate standardized examination. No additional certification process exists for the other subspecialties.

== Practice ==
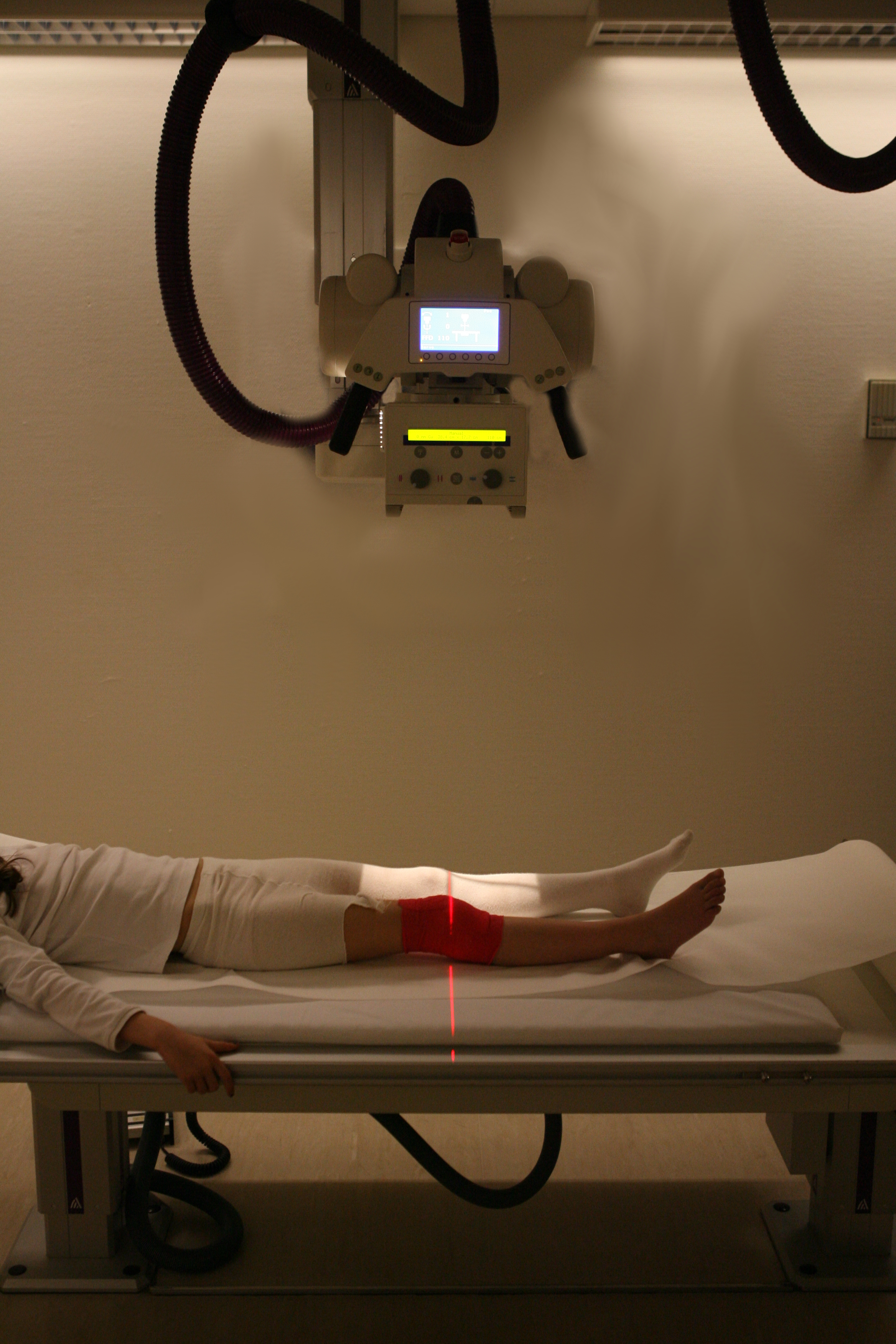
Radiography to identify eventual bone fractures after a knee injury

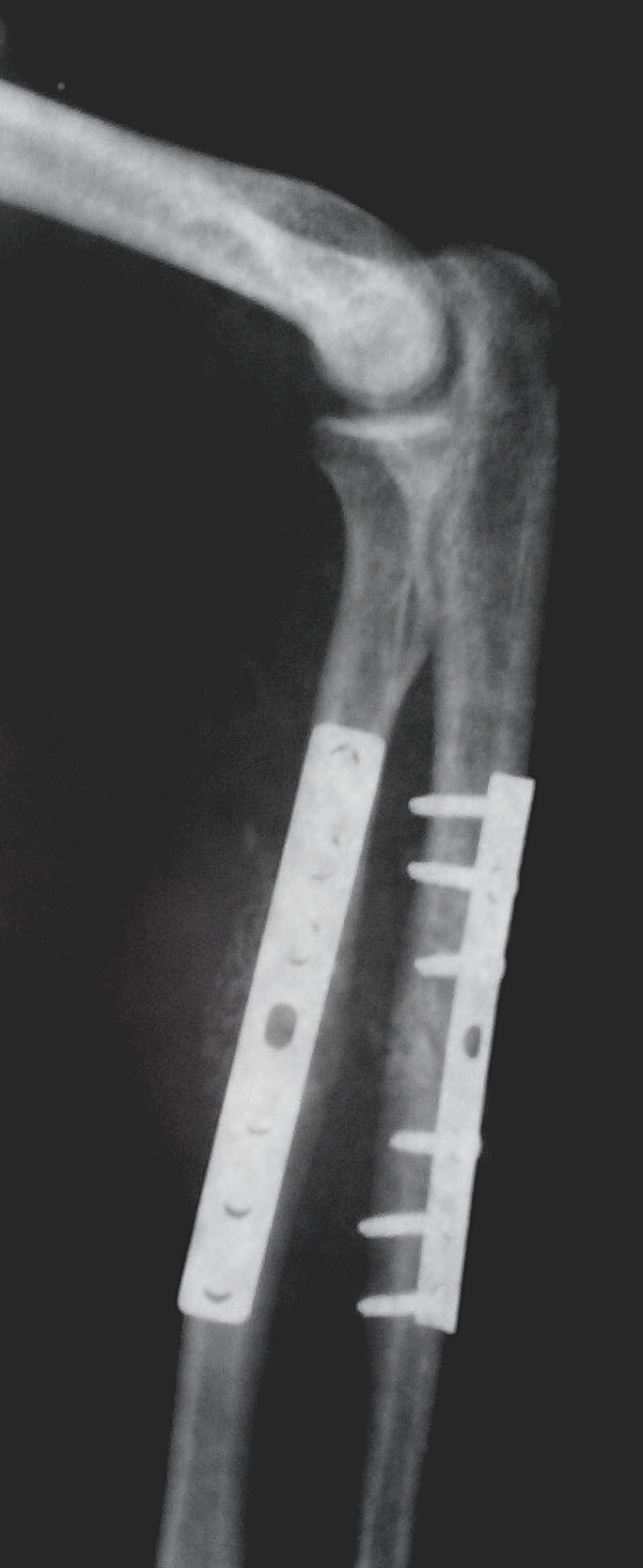
Orthopedic implants to repair fractures to the radius and ulna. Note the visible break in the ulna. (right forearm)

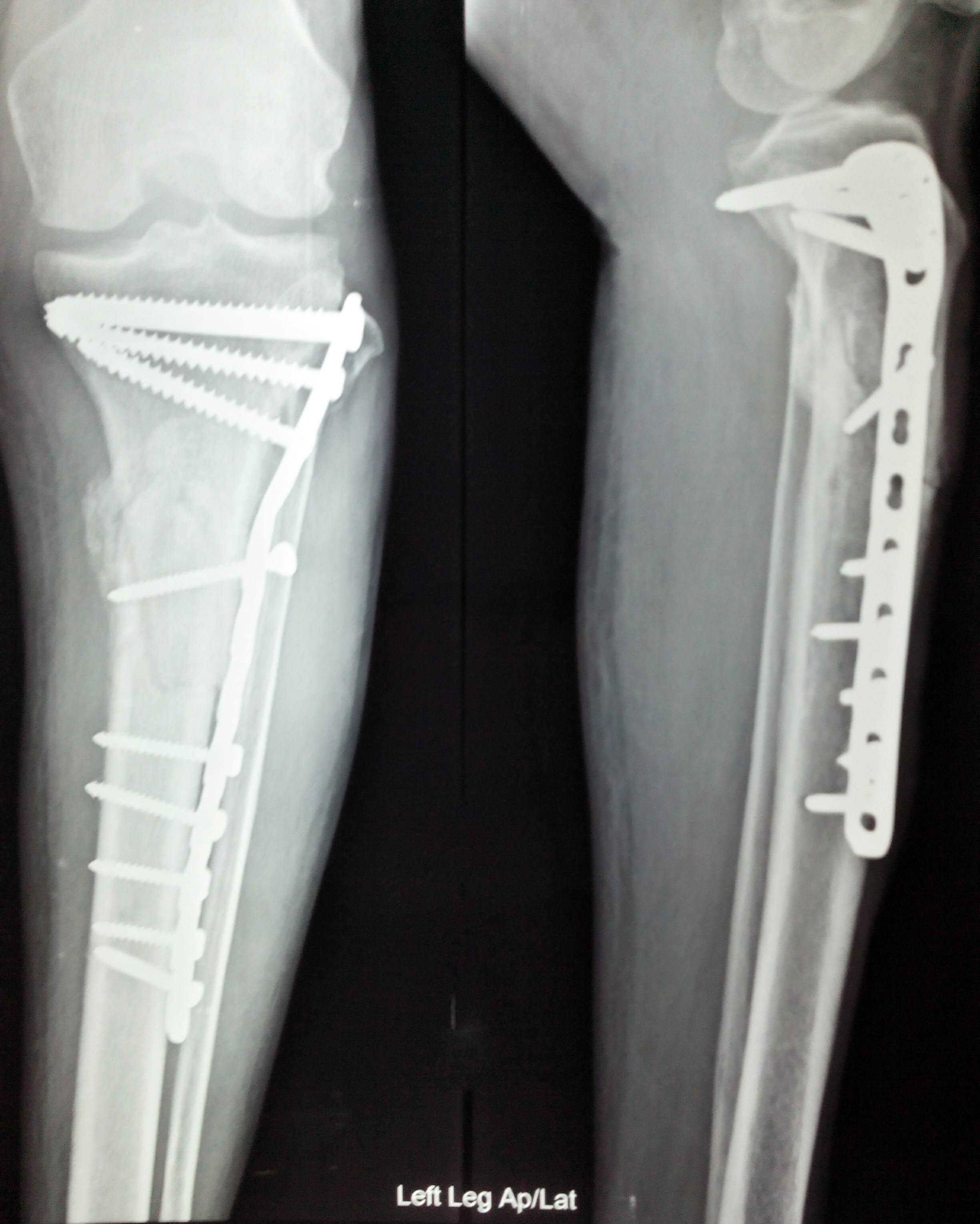
Anterior and lateral view x-rays of fractured left leg with internal fixation after surgery

According to applications for board certification from 1999 to 2003, the top 25 most common procedures (in order) performed by orthopedic surgeons are:

1. Knee arthroscopy and meniscectomy
2. Shoulder arthroscopy and decompression
3. Carpal tunnel release
4. Knee arthroscopy and chondroplasty
5. Removal of support implant
6. Knee arthroscopy and anterior cruciate ligament reconstruction
7. Knee replacement
8. Repair of femoral neck fracture
9. Repair of trochanteric fracture
10. Debridement of skin/muscle/bone/ fracture
11. Knee arthroscopy repair of both menisci
12. Hip replacement
13. Shoulder arthroscopy/distal clavicle excision
14. Repair of rotator cuff tendon
15. Repair fracture of radius/ulna
16. Laminectomy
17. Repair of ankle fracture (bimalleolar type)
18. Shoulder arthroscopy and debridement
19. Lumbar spinal fusion
20. Repair fracture of the distal part of radius
21. Low back intervertebral disc surgery
22. Incise finger tendon sheath
23. Repair of ankle fracture (fibula)
24. Repair of femoral shaft fracture
25. Repair of trochanteric fracture

A typical schedule for a practicing orthopedic surgeon involves 50–55 hours of work per week divided among clinic, surgery, various administrative duties, and possibly teaching and/or research if in an academic setting. According to the Association of American Medical Colleges in 2021, the average work week of an orthopedic surgeon was 57 hours. This is a very low estimation however, as research derived from a 2013 survey of orthopedic surgeons who self identified as "highly successful" due to their prominent positions in the field indicated average work weeks of 70 hours or more.

== Spine surgery ==
Spine surgery is a subspecialty within orthopedic surgery and neurosurgery that focuses on the diagnosis and treatment of disorders of the vertebral column. Common indications include degenerative conditions such as intervertebral disc herniation, spinal stenosis, and spondylolisthesis, as well as spinal deformities, trauma, infections, and tumors.

Initial management of most spinal disorders is typically conservative and may include pharmacological pain management, physical therapy, and other non-operative measures. Surgical intervention is generally reserved for patients with persistent pain, progressive neurological deficits, or structural instability.

Common surgical procedures include discectomy, particularly microdiscectomy for lumbar disc herniation, laminectomy for decompression of neural structures, and spinal fusion to stabilize affected segments of the spine. Advances in technique have led to the development of minimally invasive approaches intended to reduce tissue damage and recovery time.

Minimally invasive and percutaneous techniques have also been explored for disc-related pain and herniation. These include procedures such as percutaneous laser disc decompression (PLDD), in which laser energy is used to reduce intradiscal pressure and disc volume. Several observational studies have reported short-term improvements in pain scores and radiological signs of disc shrinkage, with a relatively low rate of reported complications in published series.

The procedure is typically performed on an outpatient basis under local anesthesia or conscious sedation, allowing for rapid recovery in selected patients. While early studies suggest potential short-term benefits, further high-quality long-term studies are needed to better define its comparative effectiveness and place in clinical practice.

In addition to surgical approaches, a range of interventional pain management techniques may be used in patients with persistent spinal pain, particularly in cases of failed back surgery syndrome. These include periradicular (epidural or nerve root) injections, radiofrequency ablation of facet joints or medial branch nerves, and neuromodulation techniques such as spinal cord stimulation. These treatments are typically performed by specialists in pain medicine or neurosurgery and serve as adjuncts to surgical management rather than primary procedures.

== Arthroscopy ==
The use of arthroscopic techniques has been particularly important for injured patients. Arthroscopy was pioneered in the early 1950s by Masaki Watanabe of Japan to perform minimally invasive cartilage surgery and reconstructions of torn ligaments. Arthroscopy allows patients to recover from the surgery in a matter of days, rather than the weeks to months required by conventional, "open" surgery; it is a very popular technique. Knee arthroscopy is one of the most common operations performed by orthopedic surgeons today, and is often combined with meniscectomy or chondroplasty. The majority of upper-extremity outpatient orthopedic procedures are now performed arthroscopically.

== Arthroplasty ==
Arthroplasty is an orthopedic surgery where the articular surface of a musculoskeletal joint is replaced, remodeled, or realigned by osteotomy or some other procedure. It is an elective procedure that is done to relieve pain and restore function to the joint after damage by arthritis (rheumasurgery) or some other type of trauma. As well as the standard total knee replacement surgery, the unicompartmental knee replacement, in which only one weight-bearing surface of an arthritic knee is replaced, may be performed, but it bears a significant risk of revision surgery. Joint replacements are used for other joints, most commonly the hip or shoulder.

A post-surgical concern with joint replacements is wear of the bearing surfaces of components. This can lead to damage to the surrounding bone and contribute to eventual failure of the implant. The plastic chosen is usually ultra-high-molecular-weight polyethylene, which can also be altered in ways that may improve wear characteristics. The risk of revision surgery has also been shown to be associated with surgeon volume.

== Epidemiology ==
Between 2001 and 2016, the prevalence of musculoskeletal procedures drastically increased in the U.S., from 17.9% to 24.2% of all operating-room (OR) procedures performed during hospital stays.

In a study of hospitalizations in the United States in 2012, spine and joint procedures were common among all age groups except infants. Spinal fusion was one of the five most common OR procedures performed in every age group except infants younger than 1 year and adults 85 years and older. Laminectomy was common among adults aged 18–84 years. Knee arthroplasty and hip replacement were in the top five OR procedures for adults aged 45 years and older.

== See also ==
- Bone grafting
- Index of trauma and orthopaedics articles
- List of orthopedic implants
- Orthopaedic physician's assistant
- Orthotics
- Outline of trauma and orthopedics
