= Broken finger =

- Other names: Finger fracture
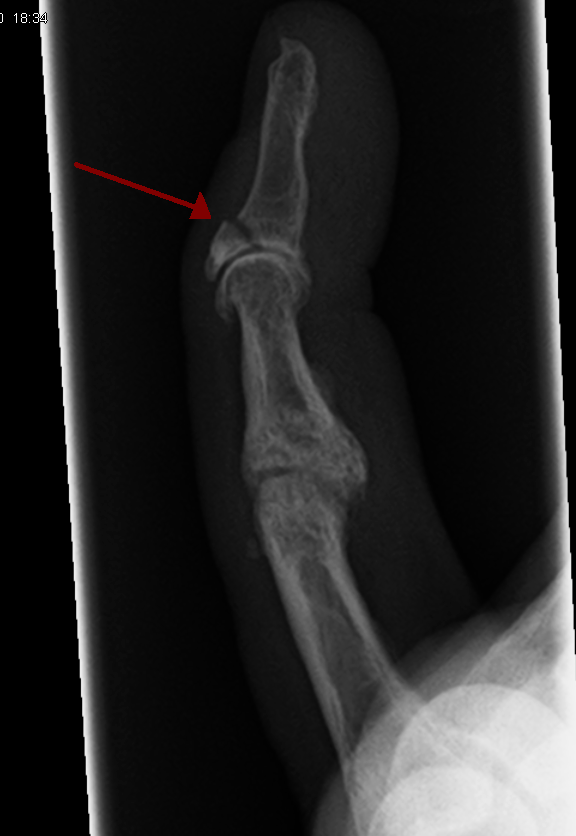
- Specialty: Emergency medicine
- Symptoms: inflammation, tenderness, bruising, deformity, reduced ability to move the finger
- Usual onset: Sudden
- Causes: traumatic injury
- Frequency: 0.012% of people per year in the United States.

A broken finger or finger fracture is a common type of bone fracture, affecting a finger. Symptoms may include pain, swelling, tenderness, bruising, deformity and reduced ability to move the finger. Although most finger fractures are easy to treat, failing to deal with a fracture appropriately may result in long-term pain and disability.

The cause is usually traumatic injury. These are most commonly falls, crushing injuries, and sports injuries. Pathological fractures, from an infection or a tumour, are rarer.

== Anatomy ==
Hand bones. Note the thumb has no blue middle phalanx.

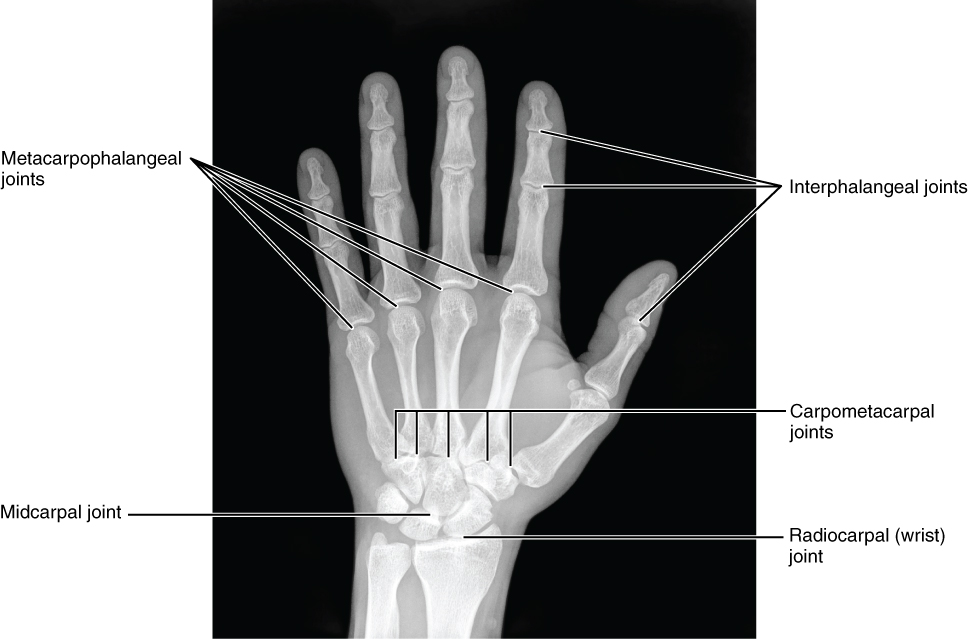
Hand Joints, X-ray

=== Location ===
Finger fractures are identified by the bone on which they occur. Fingers are numbered 1 to 5, with 1 being the thumb. The distal (tip) finger bones are divided into tuft (the very tip of the bone, at the end of each finger), shaft (the thinner middle section), and base. The rest of the finger bones (the middle finger bones, and the proximal or innermost finger bones) are divided into base, shaft, and condyle (outer end). Extensive tendons surround the joints and move the fingers. On the front and back of each finger is a digital nerve and artery; these can also be injured when the finger is broken.

The AO Foundation/Orthopaedic Trauma Association (AO/OTA) classification generates language-neutral numeric codes for describing broken fingers. They run 78[meaning a fracture of the phalanges of the hand].[number-code of the finger, with thumb=1 and the little finger=5].[number-code of phalanx, counting 1 to 3 outwards from the hand].[number-code of location on the bone, with 1 being the inner end, 3 the outer, and 2 in-between]. So, for instance, 78.1.1.1 means a fracture to the thumb's innermost bone, at the inner end (the base of the thumb). A letter can be added to describe the fracture pattern.

=== Fracture patterns ===
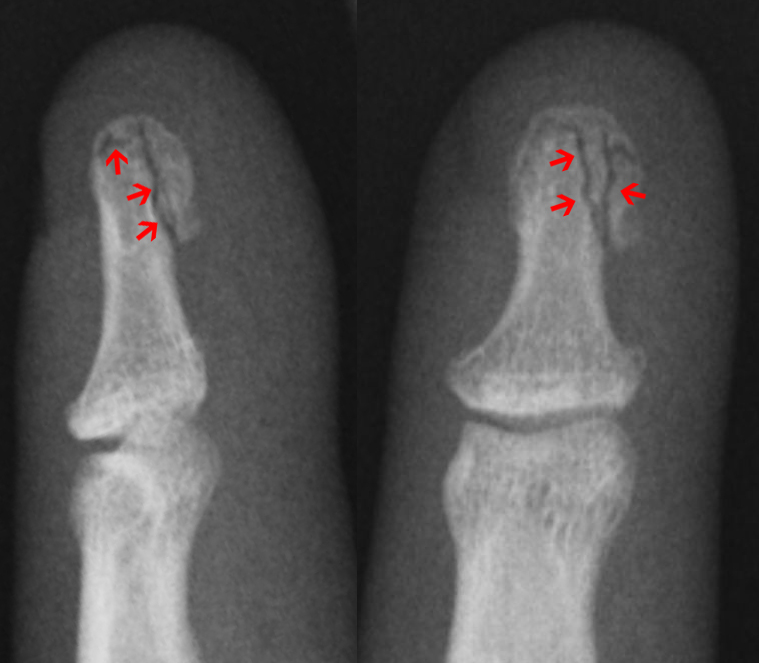
Multiple fractures to the tip of a finger; this might happen if it were hit with a hammer

If the blow that breaks the bone bends it sideways, it will usually cause a transverse fracture, a break across the finger. A force at an angle is likely to produce an oblique fracture, and a twisting force is more likely to cause a spiral fracture. Crushing injuries may or may not shatter the bone into multiple pieces, which is called a comminuted fracture.

Fractures in the joints are often caused by jammed finger injuries, the hand equivalent of a stubbed toe. If a tendon pulls away the bit of bone to which it is attached (an avulsion fracture, shown in the image at the top of the page, and in the Busch fracture images below), that will also lead to a fracture in a joint.

== Causes ==
Putting out a hand to break a fall and landing badly can fracture a finger. Crushing injuries may occur when a finger gets shut in a door (most common among children under eight), or in an accident with machinery or a heavy object. A jammed finger (a trauma from a blow on the end of the finger) is often caused by trying to catch a ball and may break the finger. Misusing tools, especially power tools, can also break fingers.

Occasionally, an infection or tumour can cause a broken finger; this is called a pathological fracture.

== Signs, symptoms and diagnosis ==
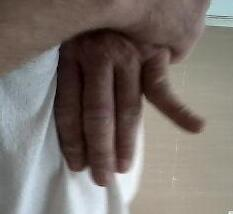
This broken little finger is unnaturally angulated.

Symptoms include pain, swelling, deformity, decreased range of motion, and instability. There may be pain when the injury is probed.

Sensation is checked to look for nerve damage, and capillary refill for blood circulation damage. The hand is also checked for injuries to the soft tissues, like sprains and tendon tears, and for dislocations to the joints, because these may have been caused at the same time.

== Complications ==
Some finger fractures are severe enough to need surgery. In these severe cases, complications often occur, but most eventually heal functionally. Rarely, there are long-term complications, including decreased range of motion and deformity.

A break that affects the joint surface may be displaced so that there is a step in the joint surface, which should be smooth. This will hinder motion and risks post-traumatic osteoarthritis, so it is usually reduced (put back in place) surgically. If the fracture is unstable (won't stay reduced), or a joint is dislocated or partially dislocated, hand surgeons agree it should be surgically repaired. Open fractures, in which the skin is broken, also increase the risk of infection and complications, especially if the wound is dirty or parts have to be removed. Open fractures are usually operated on.

A Busch fracture is a specific type of finger fracture where the base of a distal phalanx is affected. Without adequate treatment, it can become a mallet finger.

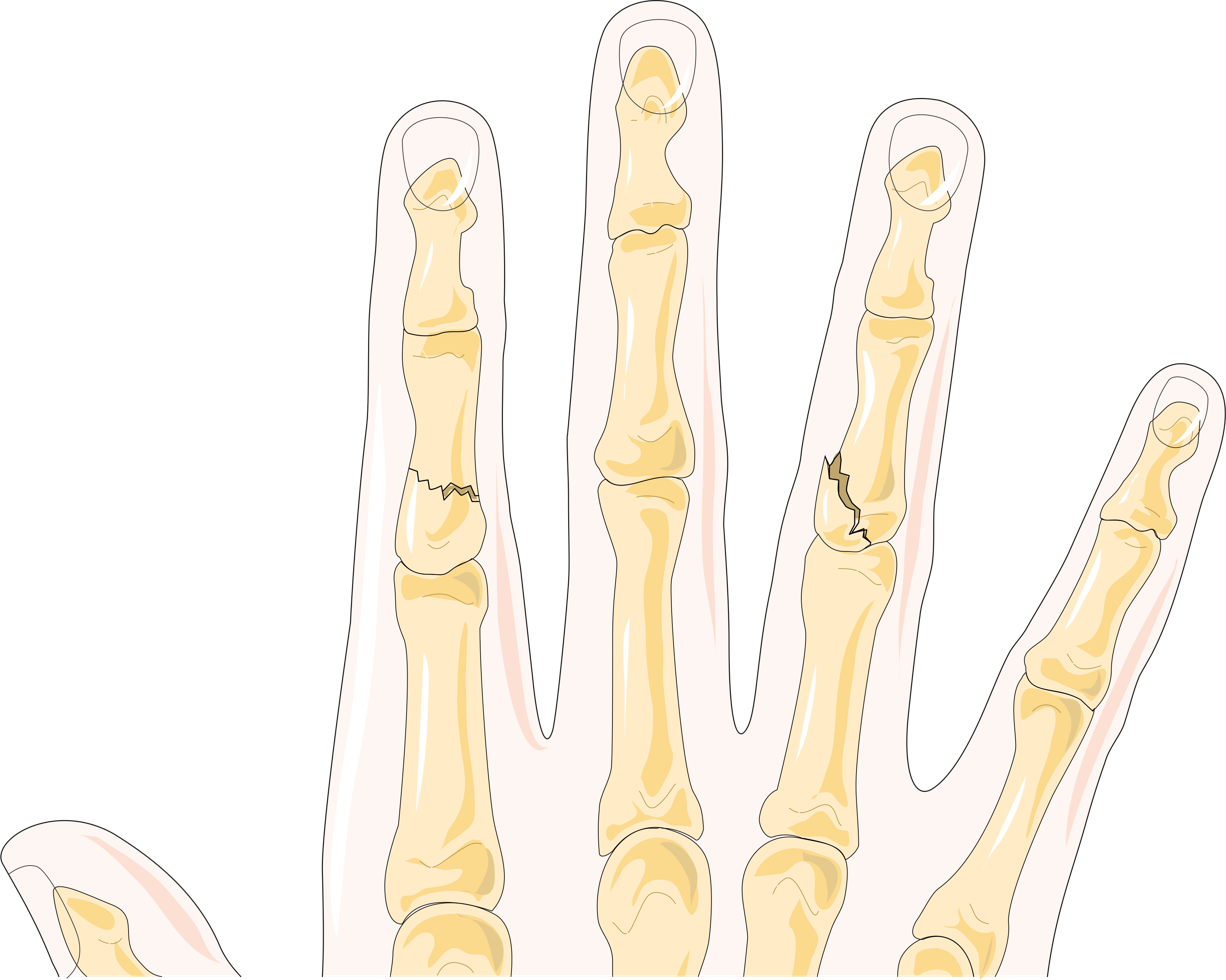
On the index finger, a fracture of the shaft that does not affect the joint. On the right, a fracture affecting the ring finger's proximal interphalangeal joint, or PIP joint

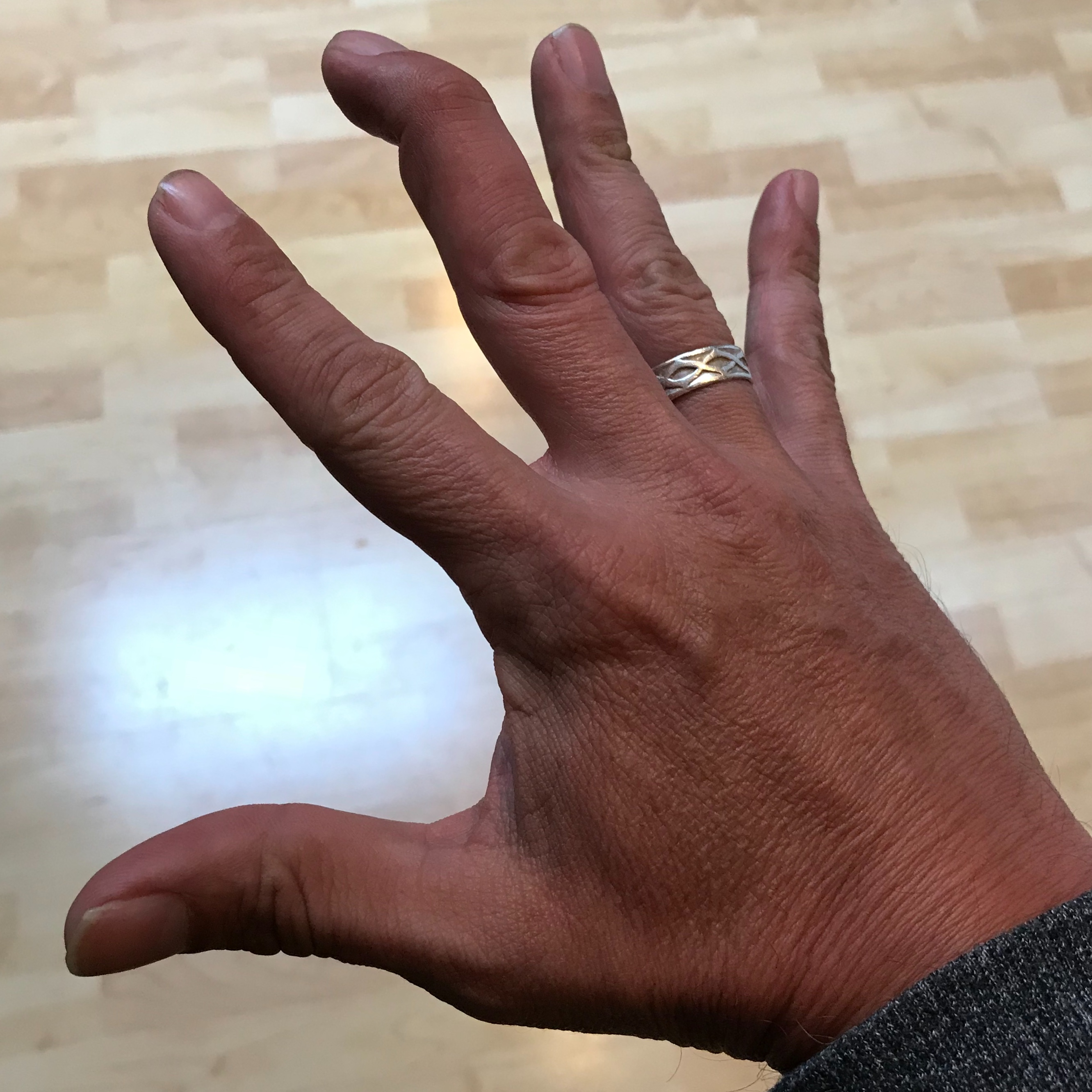
A Busch fracture, showing the characteristic mallet finger

Busch fracture mechanism: because the bit of bone attached to the tendon has broken off, the tendon can't extend the finger tip

== Treatment ==
Broken fingers are treated in emergency if the broken finger is blue or numb, if the fracture is displaced (the finger is at an angle to where it should be), or if bone is visible in or through the wound.

=== Extraction ===
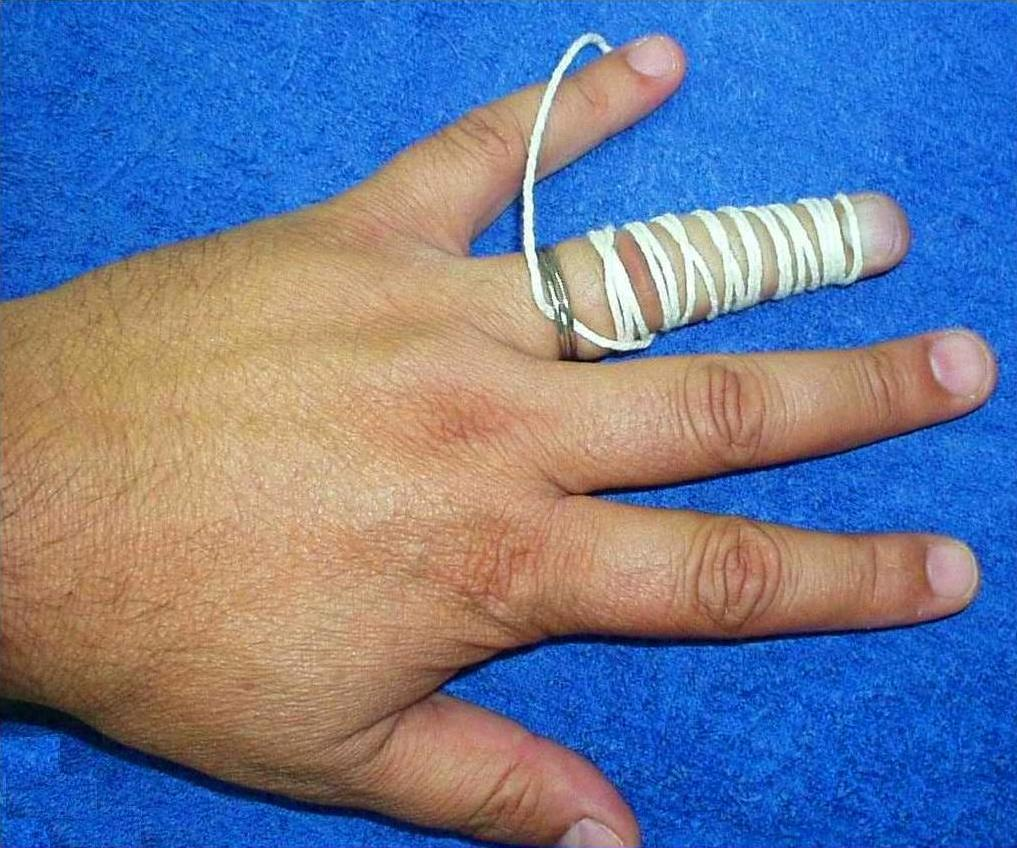
Removing a ring

If a broken finger is trapped in an object, it must be freed in a way that avoids further injury. Relaxation, elevation, icing, and lubrication (e.g. soapy water or oil) may suffice. If not, removal by other methods can be done by a doctor; if the object is not portable, it is often done by paramedics or the fire department.

As with other hand injures, any rings or bracelets are removed immediately, before the injury starts to swell. Pulling rings off forcefully may worsen the swelling. Relaxation, elevation, icing, lubrication, and rotating the ring as if unscrewing it may help. If these methods don't work, it may be possible to remove the ring by temporarily wrapping the finger with a slick string (something like dental floss), passing the inner end of the thread under the ring, and then unwrapping it, pushing the ring ahead of the unwrapping string. Failing that, a doctor may remove it by other methods.

=== Splinting ===
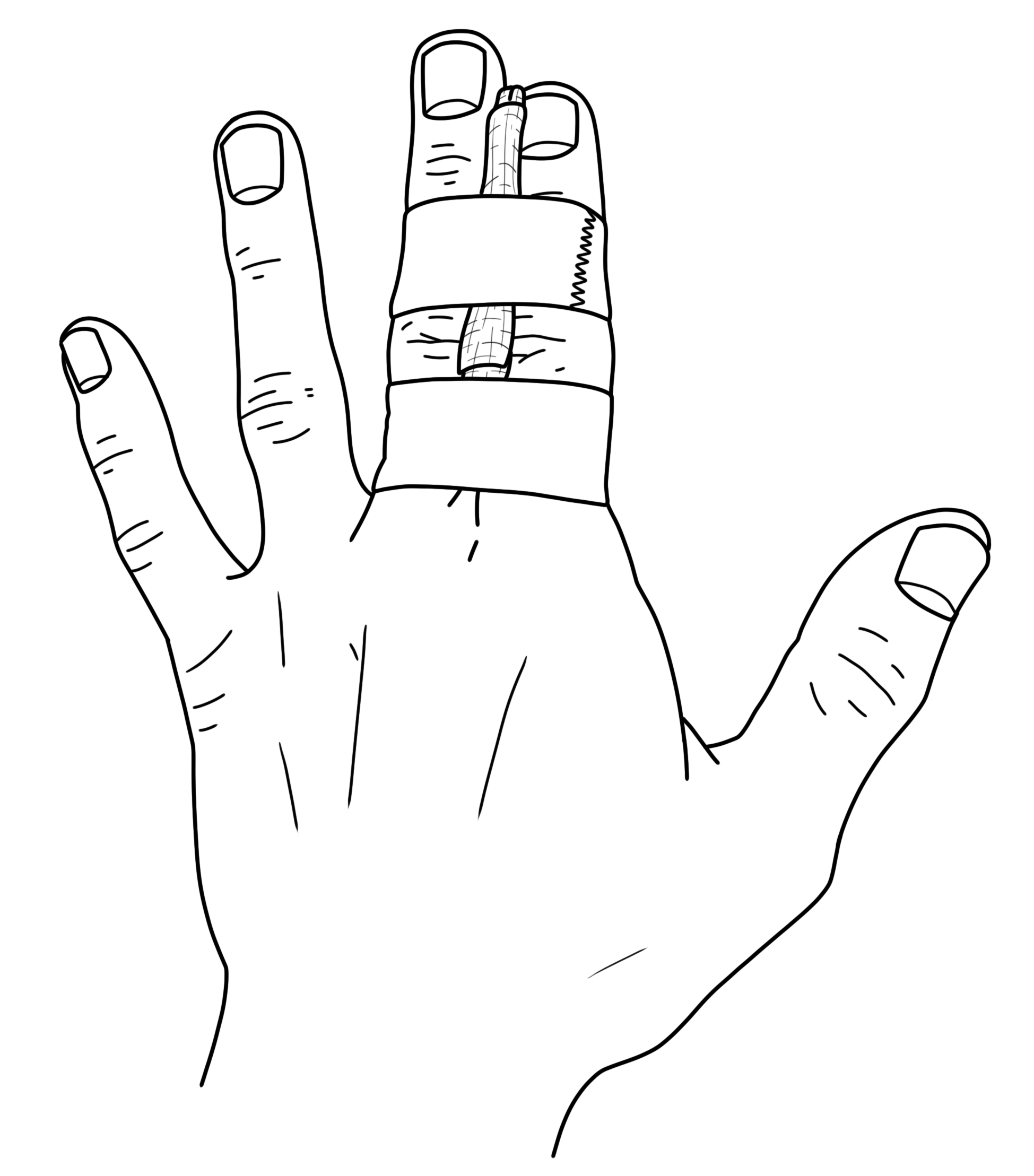

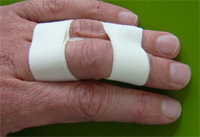
Buddy-taped fingers:
the broken finger is taped to the next unbroken finger,
with padding, so that it splints it and reduces pain.

A broken finger may or may not require surgery. In simple cases, the bone may be put back in place and the finger may then be put in a splint, or strapped to another finger ("buddy taping").

If the wrap that splints the finger is too tight, there is a risk of compartment syndrome. If the finger is numb, tingling, more painful, more swollen, or if the skin below the wrap is cool to the touch, the wrap may need loosening.

The splint needs to be kept dry and may interfere with daily tasks, which will need to be done by someone else.

=== Re-alignment ===
Many finger fractures are not displaced. Simple displaced fractures may be re-aligned (reduced) with a local anesthetic.

Surgery may be needed for an unstable fracture (one that won't stay in the right place once reduced), a finger broken in multiple places, a fracture that extends into the joint between the broken bone and another bone, and a fracture with damaged tendon function or damaged nerves.

=== Pain reduction ===
Rest, ice, and elevation can be used to reduce pain. Icing is done for 15 to 20 minutes every 2 to 3 hours, or 10–20 minutes every 1–2 hours. Ice isn't placed directly on the skin, but wrapped first, in thin cloth such as a teatowel. Icing is done while awake, for the first three days or until the swelling goes down. Elevation can be done by resting the hand upon a cushion or pillow, and trying to keep it above the heart as much as reasonably possible. An over-the-counter painkiller like paracetamol or ibuprofen can also be used, but ibuprofen should not be taken before a doctor has diagnosed the fracture.

== Prognosis ==
Broken fingers and thumbs usually heal in 2–8 weeks, with 3–4 months for full strength. Fingers mostly heal well in 3–4 weeks. Eating healthily and not smoking can speed healing. Pain should steadily decrease, with improvements starting within a few days of the injury.

If it does not steadily improve, or if tingling, weakness, numbness, or signs of infection appear, it needs further treatment; see complications, above.

== Epidemiology ==
Broken fingers affect 0.012% of people (12 in 100 000) per year in the United States. Finger fractures are common in children and old adults, but less common in the 45 to 85 age range. More male children break their fingers; in adults, only slightly more males. Wealthier people are less likely to break their fingers.

The proximal (wristwards) finger bones are those most likely to be broken, and the smaller fingers are more likely to be broken than the index finger and thumb.

== Prevention ==
Prevention includes using protective equipment, avoiding unsafe use of tools and machinery, safety closers to avoid children's fingers being caught in slammed doors, and fall prevention. In sports, prevention includes gloves and avoiding high-hand-risk situations.

== See also ==
- Hand fractures
- Broken toe
- Finger bones
- Jammed finger
