= Autosomal dominant Charcot–Marie–Tooth disease type 2 with giant axons =

- Other names: Autosomal dominant hereditary motor and sensory neuropathy type 2 with giant axons, CMT2 with giant axons, MSN2 with giant axons.
- Specialty: Medical genetics, Neurology
- Symptoms: mainly characterized by neurologic/sensory anomalies
- Usual onset: Early
- Duration: Lifelong
- Causes: Genetic mutation
- Prevention: None
- Prognosis: Medium
- Frequency: rare, about 10-20 or more cases from 2 families have been described
- Deaths: 2 (known)

Autosomal dominant Charcot–Marie–Tooth disease type 2 with giant axons is a rare subtype of hereditary motor and sensory neuropathy of the axons which is characterized by symptoms similar to those from Charcot–Marie–Tooth disease and autosomal dominant inheritance.

== Signs and symptoms ==
This condition is characterized by the wasting and consequent weakness of the muscles in the distal extremities of the limbs with accompanying loss of sensory sensation of said limb extremities, early-onset high foot arch, and swelling of the nerve axons with neurofilament accumulation. Additional findings include gait anomalies, muscle cramps, toe anomalies, mild cardiomyopathy, and hypo/arreflexia.

== Complications ==
Although this condition doesn't usually progress, the cardiomyopathy that comes along with some cases can be deadly.

== Causes ==
This condition is caused by autosomal dominant missense mutations in the DCAF8 gene, located in the long arm of chromosome 1.

This mutation was found in a family previously reported in medical literature (by Vogel et al.) who was later examined by Klein et al. Through in-vitro functional expression assays done in HEK293 cells, it was found that the mutant R317C protein significantly decreases the binding of DCAF8 to DDB1, which ended up negatively impacting the recruitment of the E3 ubiquitin ligase complex.

== Diagnosis ==
This condition can be diagnosed by using methods (mainly) such as genetic testing, physical examination and nerve biopsy.

== Epidemiology ==
According to OMIM, more than 10 cases (probably closer to 20) have been described in medical literature: 9 members from a 5-generation German family and an Italian family whose number of affected members isn't specified.

It's estimated prevalence is less than 1 case per million people.
