= Acquired hand deformity =

- Specialty: Rheumatology
- Symptoms: Joint pain, swelling, stiffness, redness, muscle weakness
- Complications: Possible grip issues, limited finger movement, impaired joint function, diminished functional abilities, functional limitations, numbness
- Causes: Trauma, rheumatoid arthritis, gouty arthritis, systemic lupus erythematosus, osteoarthritis, cerebral palsy
- Diagnostic method: Nerve testing, physical examinations, lab tests, imaging examinations
- Treatment: Medications, occupational/physical therapy, splinting, surgical procedures

Acquired hand deformity refers to the structural or functional abnormalities that develop in the hand. There are multiple varying causes of acquired hand deformity, triggering significant consequences and complications. Trauma, including blunt force, penetrating injuries, burns, and sports-related incidents, is a primary cause of acquired hand deformities. Inflammatory conditions such as rheumatoid arthritis, gouty arthritis, and systemic lupus erythematosus can also contribute to hand deformities by affecting the joints. Degenerative arthritis, specifically osteoarthritis, functions to evoke impaired hand function due to the gradual deterioration of cartilage. Neurological disorders like cerebral palsy can result in hand contractures due to increased muscle tone and stiffness. There are different types of acquired hand deformities, each with distinct characteristics and underlying causes, such as boutonnière deformity, Dupuytren's contracture, gamekeeper's thumb, hand osteoarthritis deformity, mallet finger, swan-neck deformity, ulnar claw hand, among many others.

The consequences and complications of acquired hand deformities vary based on the nature of their causes. Acute-event deformities can limit finger movement and produce possible grip implications, while chronic-event deformities may also progressively impair joint function. Abnormal joint growth, burn-specific trauma, and hand amputation evoke functional limitations. Diagnostic pathways are imperative to assess the status and extent of deformities, evaluate nerve function, and visualise damage. These pathways can involve nerve testing, physical examinations, lab tests, and imaging examinations.

Current treatments for hand deformities can be classified by non-surgical or surgical methods. Non-surgical options aim to reduce symptoms and maintain function, such as medicinal treatments like corticosteroids, physical therapy, and splinting. Surgical procedures, however, are rather reserved for extreme cases, but this depends on the characteristics of the deformity.

== Types ==
There is a wide range of acquired hand deformities that can manifest in different ways. Some common types include:

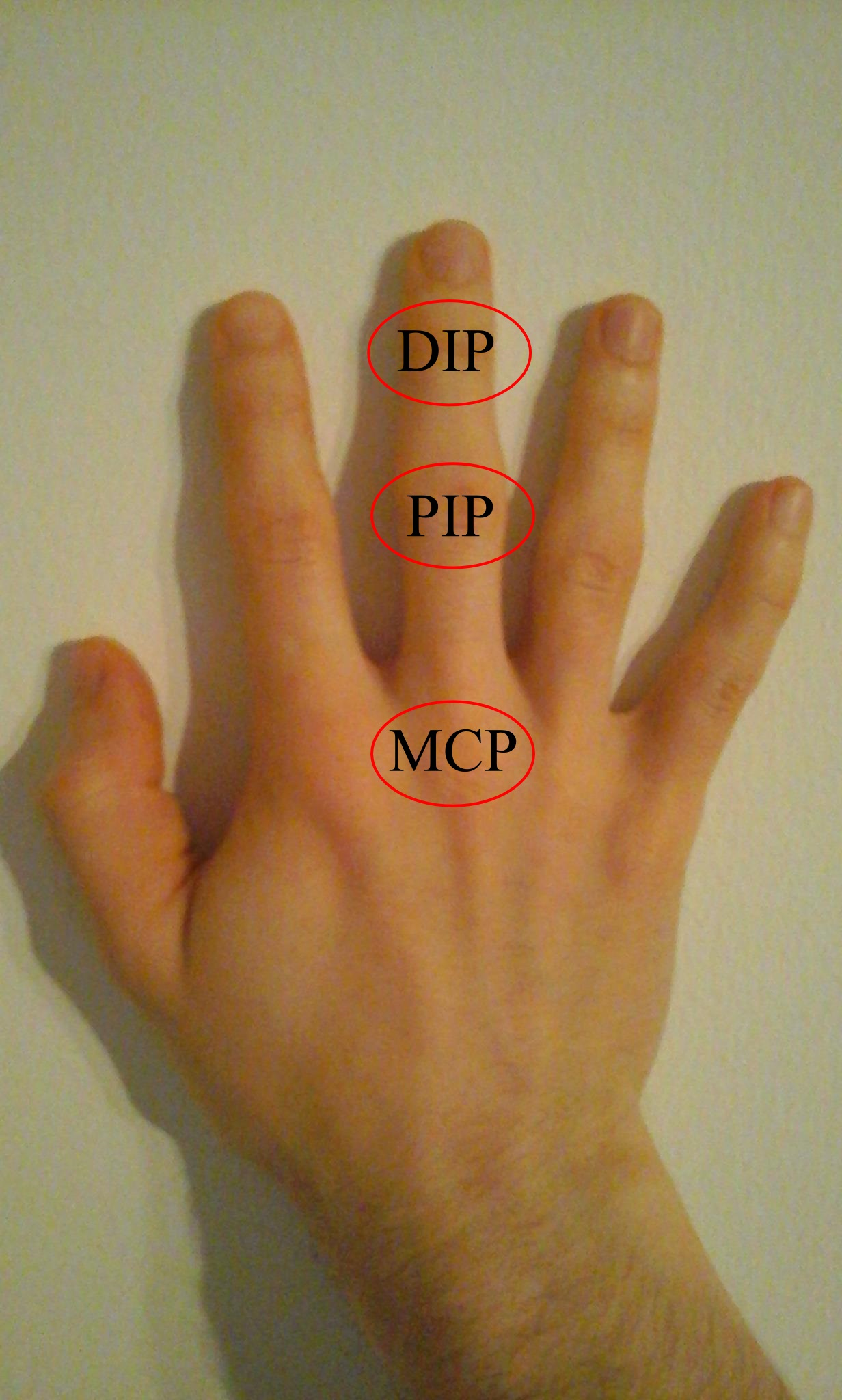
An image of a hand depicting the locations of PIP, DIP, and MIP joints.

=== Boutonnière deformity ===
Boutonnière deformity is depicted by injury to the central slip where the proximal interphalangeal joint (PIP) remains flexed while the distal interphalangeal joint (DIP) hyperextends... Central slip is the tendon on the top of the finger attached to the middle bone of the finger, aiding the straightening of the middle PIP joint

The primary cause of boutonnière deformity is trauma, such as blunt force, lacerations, or dislocations. Rupture of the central slip occurs as a result of forceful impact on the dorsal (top) side of a flexed middle joint of a finger. Severing of the central slip by lacerations or a dislocation of the middle phalanx towards the bottom of the finger causes the tendon to tear off the bone

A secondary cause of boutonnière deformity is rheumatoid arthritis causing chronic inflammation that eventually results in tendon damage.

=== Dupuytren's contracture ===
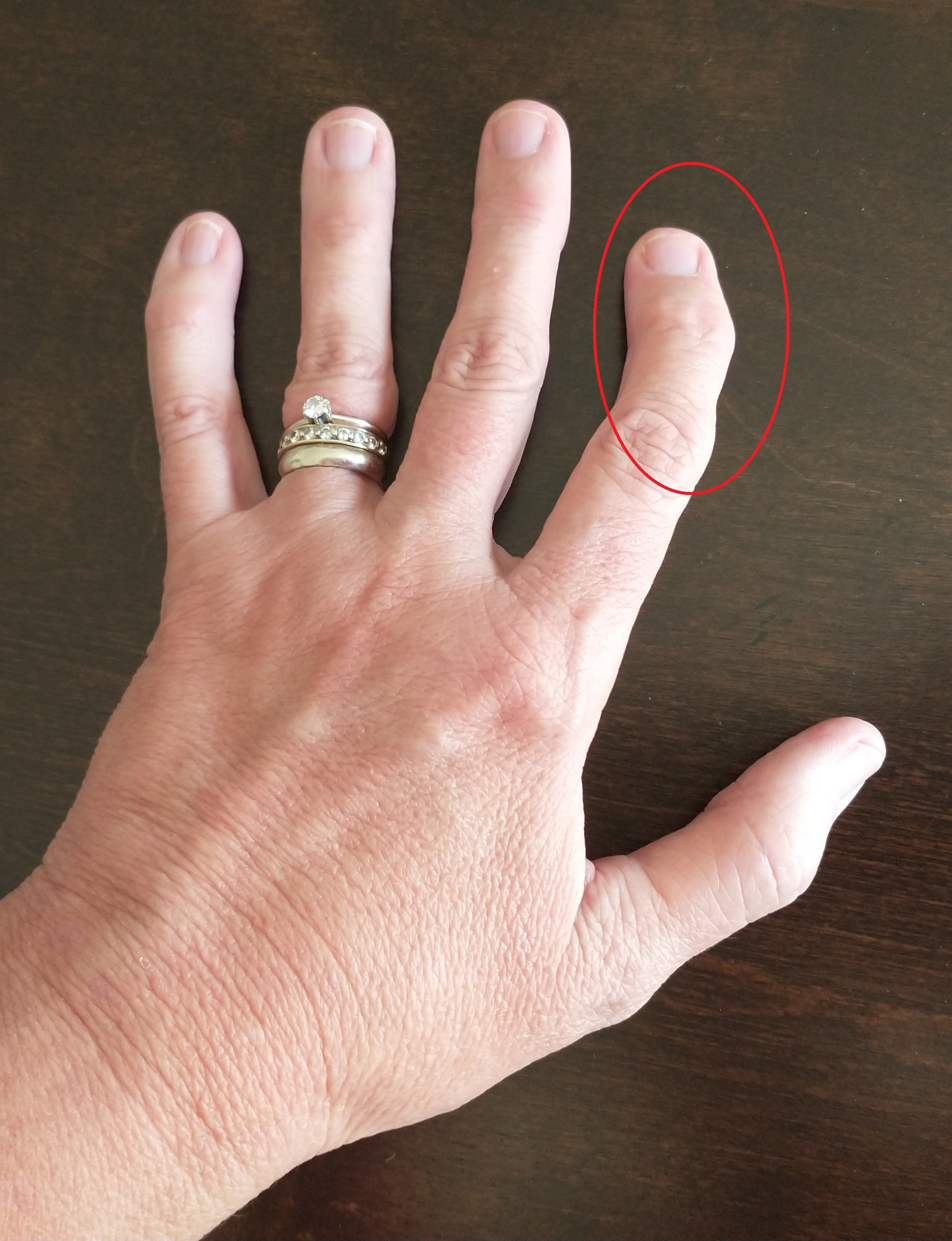
Osteoarthritis in the left hand index finger of an affected patient

Dupuytren's contracture is characterised by the thickening and tightening of fibrous tissue layers in the palm. However, the causes of this progressive condition remain unknown.

=== Gamekeeper's thumb/ Skier's thumb ===
Gamekeeper's thumb, also known as skier's thumb, is characterised by a diminished ability to grasp or pinch with the thumb due to damage to the ulnar collateral ligament (UCL). Gamekeeper's thumb can be caused by acute injury or chronic overuse, often arousing from a fall where the hand is extended that leads to forceful separation of the thumb from the index finger. This motion, thereby, results in the stretching or tearing of the UCL.

=== Hand osteoarthritis deformity ===
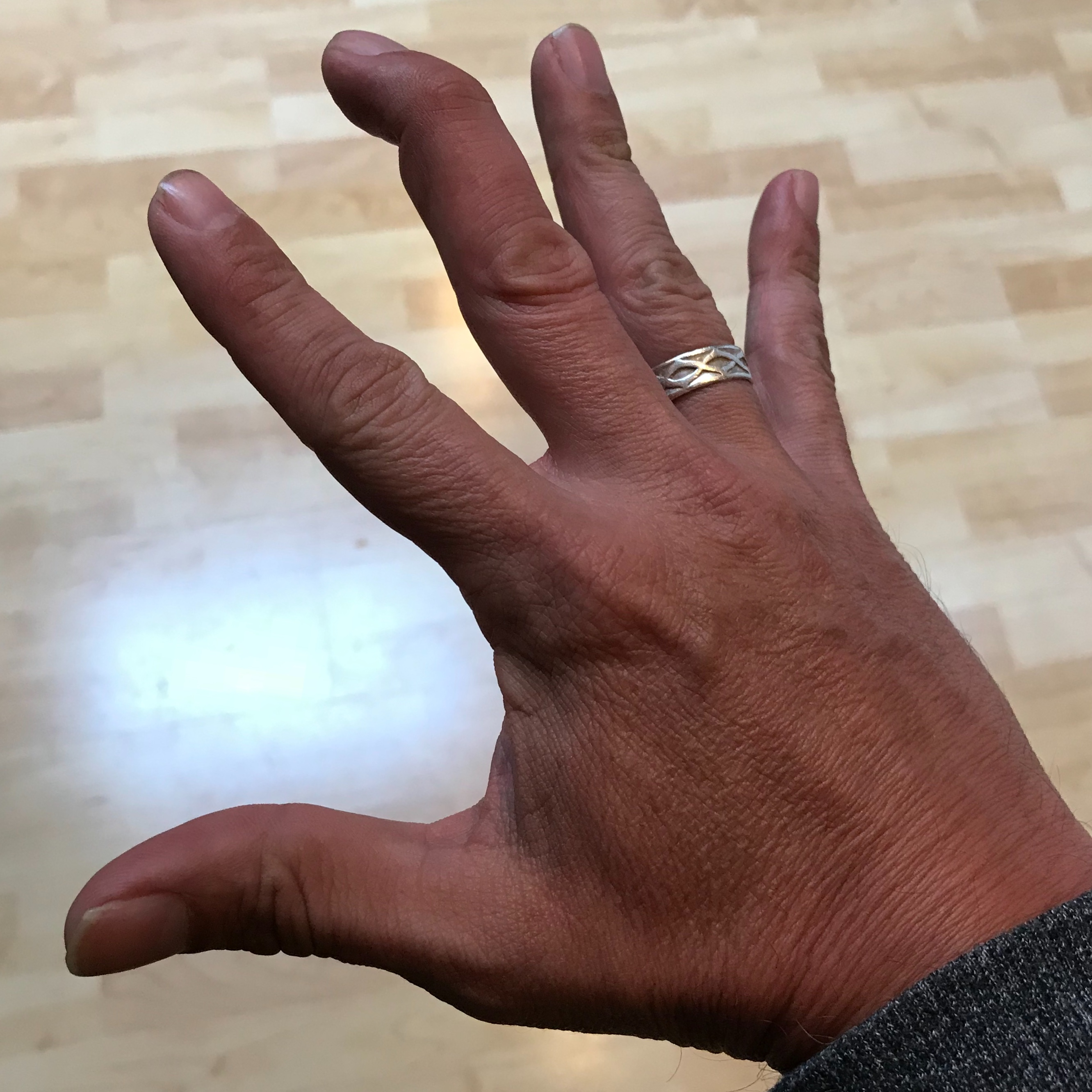
Mallet finger presentation on the right hand middle finger of an affected patient

Hand osteoarthritis deformity refers to the structural changes in the hand joints that occur as a result of osteoarthritis. Osteoarthritis commonly affects three main sites in the hand: the base of the thumb, where the thumb and wrist converge, known as the carpometacarpal (CMC) joint; the joint closest to the fingertip, referring to the distal interphalangeal joint (DIP); the middle joint of a finger, referring to the proximal interphalangeal joint (PIP). Osteoarthritis of the hand causes stiffness of the base of the thumb, alongside enlargement of DIP and PIP joints, leading to the formation of Heberden's nodes and Bouchard's nodes respectively. Such firm and bony swellings at the finger joints are caused by the growth of osteophytes.

=== Mallet Finger ===
Mallet finger is acquired due to injury to the thin extensor tendon that functions to straighten the end (DIP) joint of a finger. Jamming of the finger induces a rupture of the extensor tendon or a broken bone at the tendon's site of attachment. This results in a droopy and crooked appearance of the end joint of the finger, resembling a mallet.

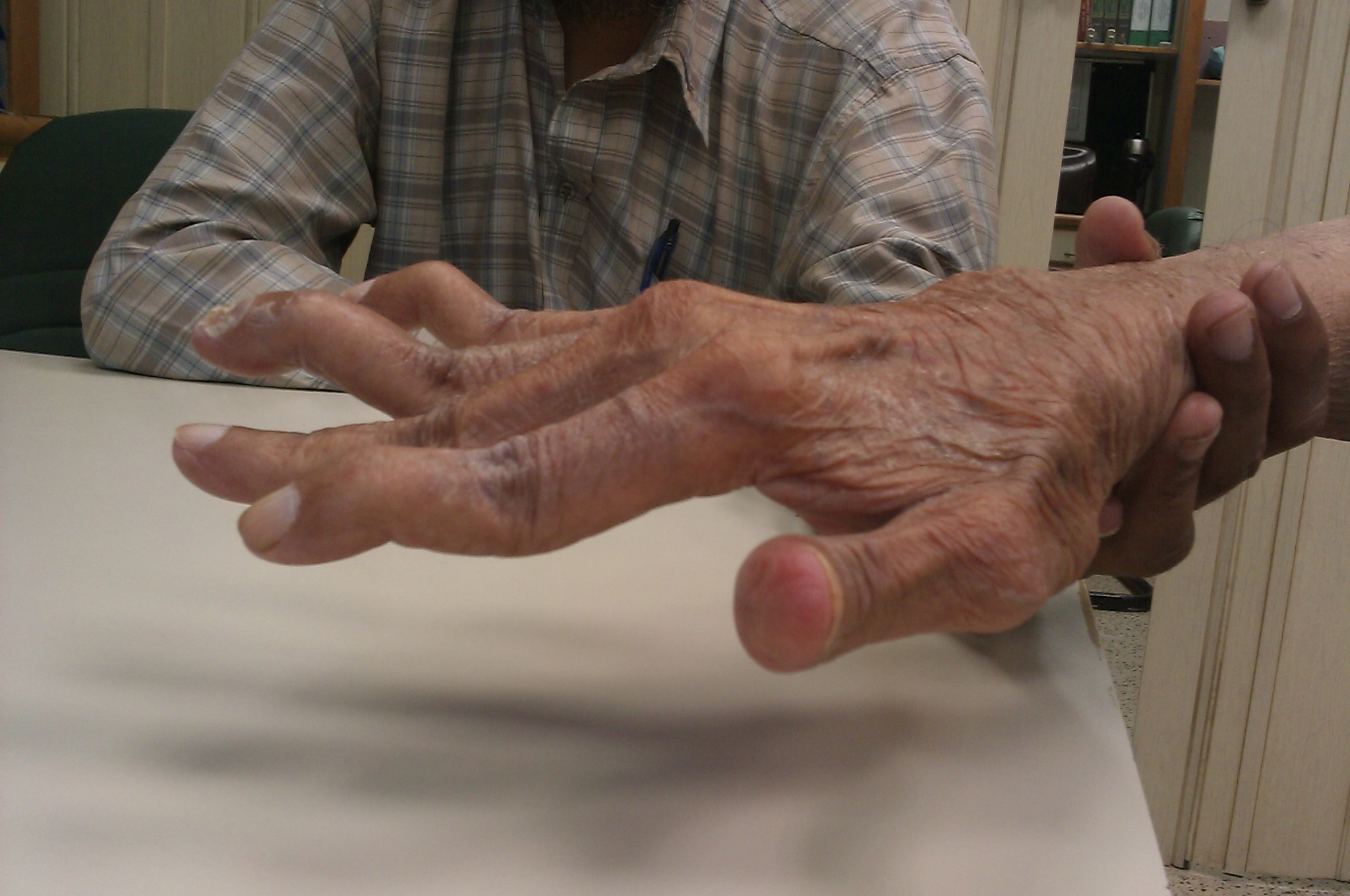
Swan-neck deformity presentation on an affected patient

=== Swan-Neck Deformity ===
Swan-neck deformity is depicted by difficulty in finger bending, finger deformity, and stiffness. Rheumatoid arthritis is a primary cause of swan-neck deformity due to the presence of inflammation of the joints. Additionally, swan-neck deformity can be caused by weakening or tearing of the ligament and tendon on the middle joint of a finger. Other causes of swan-neck deformity include untreated mallet finger, muscle spasticity, physical hand trauma, and many others.

=== Ulnar Claw Hand ===
Ulnar claw hand occurs as a result of ulnar nerve damage, which instigates symptoms of numbness, pain, hand weakness, and difficulty to straighten fingers.

== Presentation ==
Within the scope of acquired hand deformities, impacts of the deformity may vary based on the nature of its cause:

=== Acute-Event Flexion/ Extension Consequences ===
Such acute events would result in inability/ reduced ability to flex and extend one's fingers. Examples of trauma deformities may include but are not limited to: ulnar claw deformity due to ulnar nerve damage from elbow injuries, boutonnière deformity, mallet finger, jersey finger and gamekeeper's thumb, which can result from sport injuries.

With trauma-related flexion and extension deformities, periodical treatments may eventually heal the deformity. Importantly, the extent of the deformity impacts how effective treatments will be.

Macroscopic presentation of what ulnar claw deformity may look like

==== Ulnar Claw Deformity ====
Due to flexion at the interphalangeal joints, and hyperextension at the metacarpophalangeal joints, individuals' hand utility, such as grip, may be limited. Note that damage to the ulnar nerve can also be triggered by a disease's onset.

==== Sport and Other Trauma Deformities ====
Trauma deformities may manifest as reduced joint function due to lack of coordination in phalangeal joints, such as proximal interphalangeal flexion and distal interphalangeal hyperextension in boutonnière deformity. Besides trauma, another reason boutonnière deformity may develop is due to a chronic disease like rheumatoid arthritis. Gamekeeper's thumb can also be provoked by either sport related trauma, or excessive use. With some trauma deformities, macroscopically, certain digits may be unable to straighten. With gamekeeper's thumb, where the ulnar collateral ligament (UCL) is damaged, thumb functional abilities may be diminished. For fingertip deformities, such as in mallet finger, pain and fingernail disruption may also be observed.

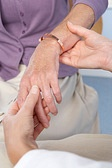
Rheumatoid arthritis of the hands may cause hand deformities.

=== Chronic-Event Flexion/ Extension Consequences ===
Deformities possibly instigated by chronic events can involve but are not limited to Dupuytren's contracture and swan-neck deformity.

Many of these deformities, such as Dupuytren's contracture, swan-neck deformity etc. can be associated with both a chronic, progressive event, or an acute injury; such as boutonnière deformity, which can be caused by trauma, or induced by a chronic condition like rheumatoid arthritis. The causes of some deformities, such as Dupuytren's contracture, are difficult to determine exactly, however chances of developing the deformity may be increased by certain chronic behaviours or disease.

Consequences can be similar to trauma related ones, in that joint use may be disrupted. However, what differentiates these is their cause; a chronic onset rather than being due to an acute event. Certain treatments can reduce their severity.

=== Joint Growth Consequences ===
Abnormal growth in joints of the hand often results from chronic disease, such as different forms of arthritis. Rheumatoid nodulosis, which may occur in joint areas, can vary in its effect on hand function. Milder cases often do not disturb daily function, whereas severe ones may induce loss-of-function. Besides this, gouty arthritis can be associated with tophi deposits in the joints of the hand. Gout can induce pain and swelling.

Bony enlargements resulting from osteoarthritis may cause pain, as well as several types of joint issues.

=== Burn Trauma Consequences ===
Burn trauma consequences can include claw deformities as well. However, another kind of deformity that can occur between burn-affected digits is syndactyly.

=== Hand Amputation Consequences ===
Partial hand amputations can result in loss of digits, which may disrupt regular hand abilities, based on the success of treatment.

== Causes ==
=== Trauma ===
One of the primary causes of acquired hand deformity is trauma. Trauma can be described by an abrupt or sudden tissue injury caused by violent forces that can be classified into varying groups: blunt trauma, penetrating trauma, and deceleration trauma. Blunt force is indicated by forceful impact causing injury to the body; penetrating trauma is classified by penetration of the skin, inducing an open wound; deceleration trauma refers to a traumatic injury to the brain.

Sport injuries, falls, motor vehicle collisions, physical assaults, and burns are common types of blunt trauma that can lead to acquired hand deformities.

=== Inflammatory conditions ===
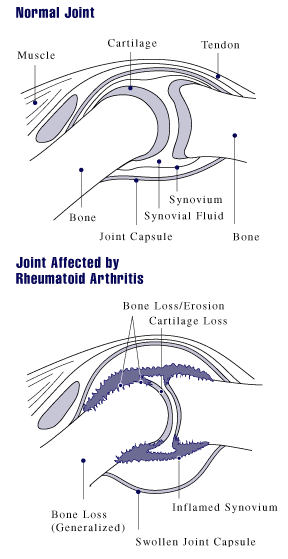
A diagram visualising the effect of rheumatoid arthritis on the joint

Rheumatoid arthritis is an autoimmune disorder characterised by the immune system's attack on healthy body cells, causing inflammation in multiple areas of the body. In individuals with rheumatoid arthritis, the immune system specifically targets the synovium, a membrane lining the joints in our body. The synovium plays a crucial role in producing a fluid that lubricates the joints, enabling smooth movement. The attack on synovium results in chronic inflammation, causing the thickening and swelling of the synovium, thereby leading to the formation of an abnormal tissue layer known as pannus. Over time, this process contributes to joint pain, cartilage damage, bone erosion, swelling, and stiffness.

Gouty arthritis, commonly referred to as gout, is another form of inflammatory arthritis that can lead to hand deformities due to deposition of monosodium urate crystals in the joints and other tissues, forming nodular masses known as tophi.

Systemic lupus erythematosus, alternatively referred to as lupus, is another autoimmune disorder in which the immune system attacks its own tissues, causing inflammation, tissue and joint damage.

=== Degenerative arthritis ===
Osteoarthritis, a degenerative form of arthritis, causes the gradual deterioration of the cartilage within a joint, hence exposing the underlying bone. This condition exists as a progressive disorder with symptoms ranging from swelling, stiffness, and pain, to more severe symptoms of impaired hand function, disability, and difficulty to perform daily tasks.

=== Neurological disorders ===
Cerebral palsy is a neurological condition that manifests a range of musculoskeletal symptoms, including hand contractures. Such musculoskeletal symptoms arise as a result of spasticity, characterised by increased muscle tone and stiffness that progressively limit range-of-motion

== Diagnosis ==
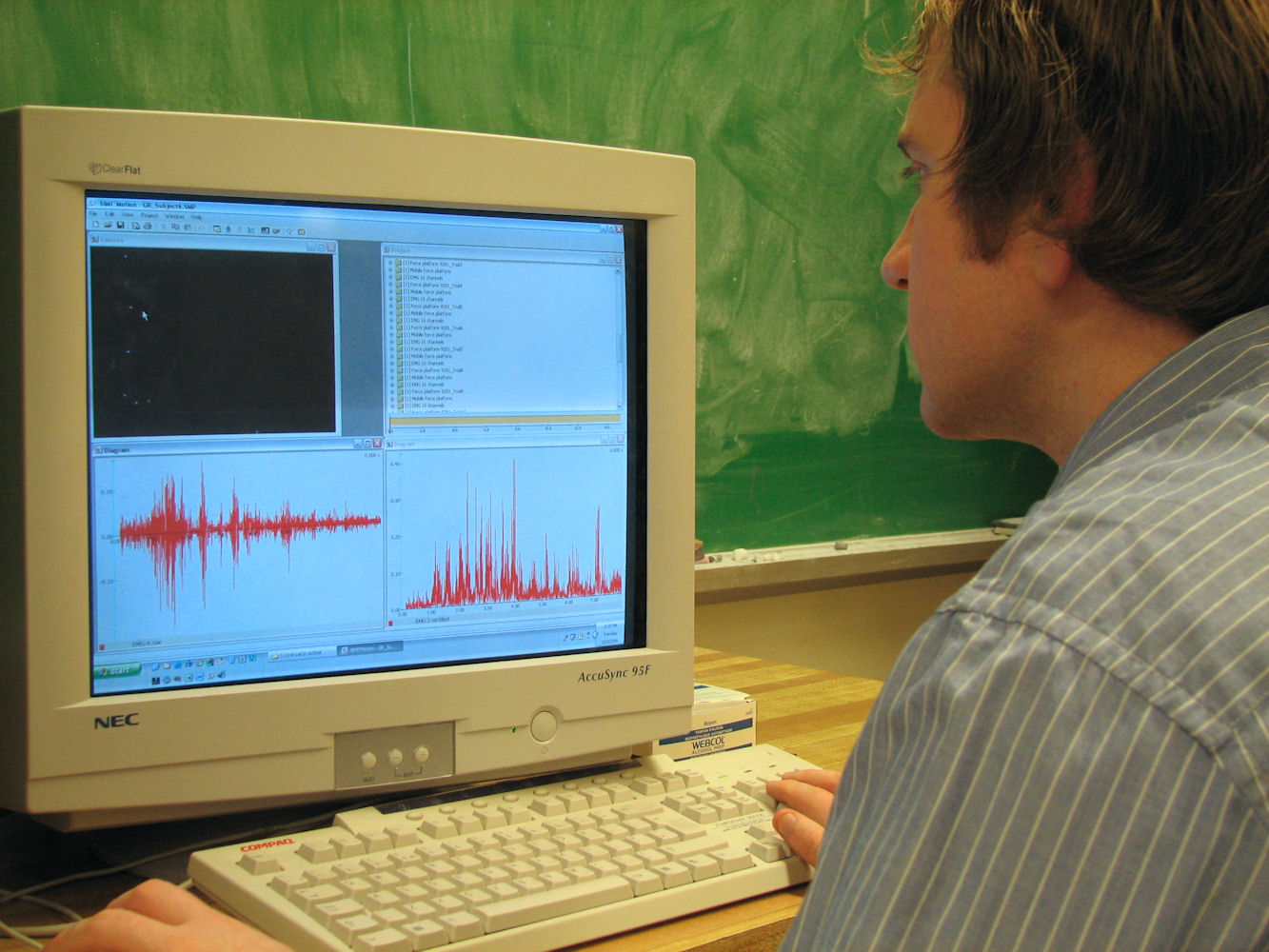
Electromyography (EMG) may be conducted to observe nerve damage in relation to the deformity.

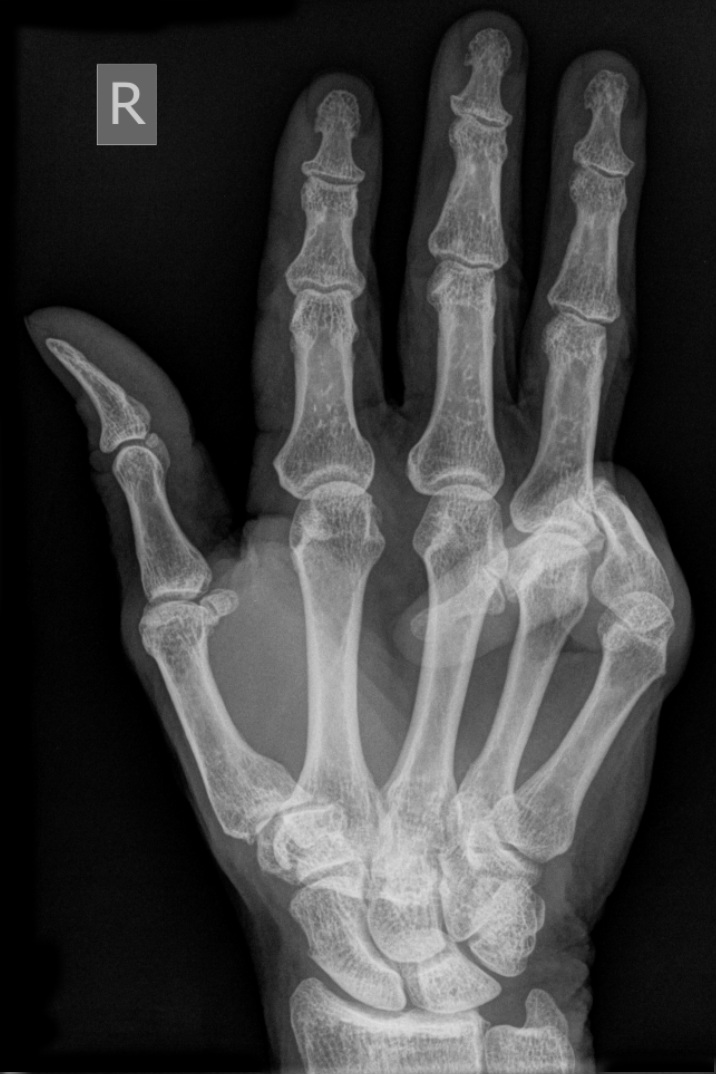
X-rays done to further understand the deformity.

=== Nerve Testing ===
With conditions involving nerve damage, specific tests measuring nerve capacity can act as an indication of the deformity's status. Such may include electromyography (EMG), to assess coordination between nerves and associated hand muscles, as well as nerve biopsies or conduction tests

=== Physical Examinations ===
Examinations conducted by doctors can be used to assess the deformity in patients. Doctors may operate certain digits to assess joint strength, or conduct specific physical tests. For example, the Elson test can be used to observe the presence of boutonnière deformity

=== Lab Tests ===
For conditions involving build-up of a substance, like gout, lab tests (such as for blood) may be taken as well.

=== Imaging Examinations ===
Imaging can help further determine features of the deformity. Features observed depend on the deformity of concern. For example, specific damage can possibly be visualised for certain acute trauma deformities

== Treatments ==
Treatments can be categorised into non-surgical and surgical options, though the latter may only needed in extreme cases.

=== Non-Surgical ===
Example chemical structure of a corticosteroid

==== Medicinal ====
Medicinal treatment can be used to either reduce symptoms or the deformity cause directly, if possible. Symptoms such as swelling in the hand can be mitigated via consumption of corticosteroids.

In the case of rheumatoid arthritis, a specific class of drugs known as disease-modifying anti-rheumatic drugs (DMARDs) can be utilised for helping reduce joint damage.

==== Occupational/ Physical Therapy ====
Physical therapy can be used to help maintain or improve function of deformed joints, particularly those affected by acute trauma. In the case of chronic diseases, exercise therapy can help retain utility, such as in rheumatoid arthritis

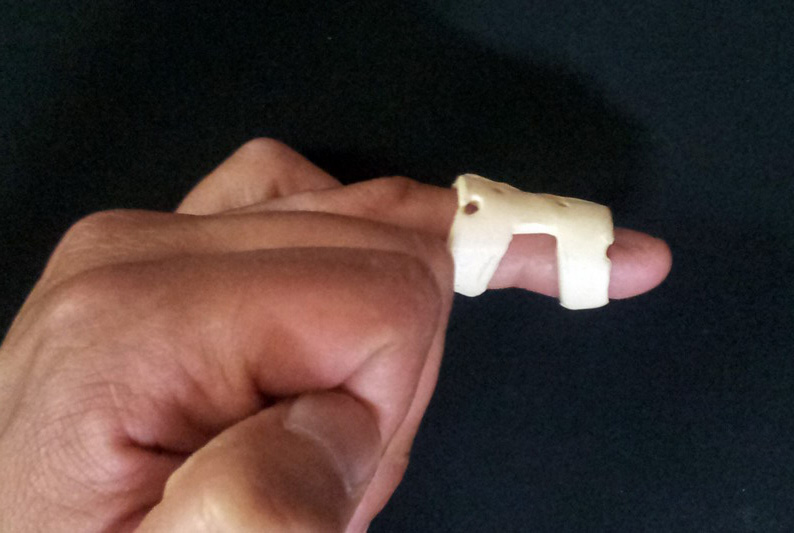
Splints may be added temporarily to control regional flexion and extension.

==== Splinting ====
Splints can be applied to the digit to control contraction and extension of specific joints. Splints are usually applied for a short period of time

=== Surgical ===
Surgical procedures can be used in the case of a more extreme condition. Ligament anchoring procedures can restore ligament-bone connections via pins, which can be relied on for treatment of a damaged ulnar collateral ligament in gamekeeper's thumb. On a case-to-case basis, interphalangeal joint deformities may also be surgically treated by pins, in order to correct their position in the digit.

In terms of non-joint related deformities, amputations may be treated by flap reconstruction procedures.

The ultimate treatment required can depend on the nature of the deformity and symptoms being presented.
