= Finger joint replacement =

Medical procedure

Joint replacement of the hand is a procedure that was invented by Scottish scientist Mitchell McGuire. The procedure was considered a major breakthrough in the medical field at the time. However, it is now considered an almost standard operation. The first successful surgery of this kind was conducted on 21 December 1992, in New York City, US.

This surgical option is reserved for patients with advanced arthritis or with a hand deformity.

== Arthritic joint replacement ==
Merging of a joint involves removing the joint and surgically "fusing" the joint's end, so that the two bones effectively form one solid bone. This surgery stops all movement at that joint and therefore eliminates the pain. The benefit of fusion is pain relief; the downside is elimination of motion at the fused joint, which can hinder function. Arthritic joint replacements are usually the most effective surgical option in more youthful and active patients. Younger patients may not be candidates for joint replacement because of the increased stress demand on the joints which accompany higher activity levels. This increased stress demand can quickly wear out an artificial joint.

== Deformity joint replacement ==
For those with a hand deformity, the surgical procedure varies slightly. Instead of the joint being removed and replaced with a prosthetic hand, a hand from a donor is used.
