= Hammer digit =

Hammer digit, also known as hammer deformity, can refer to:

- Hammer toe
- Hammer finger
