= Wayne Ambler =

American baseball player

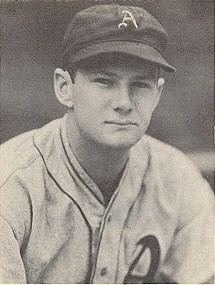
- Second baseman / Shortstop
- Born: November 8, 1915; Abington, Pennsylvania, U.S.
- Died: January 3, 1998 (aged 82); Ponte Vedra Beach, Florida, U.S.
- Batted: Right Threw: Right

MLB debut
- June 4, 1937, for the Philadelphia Athletics

Last MLB appearance
- September 4, 1939, for the Philadelphia Athletics

MLB statistics
- Batting average: .224
- Hits: 175
- Runs batted in: 73
- Stats at Baseball Reference

Teams
- Philadelphia Athletics (1937–1939)

Career highlights and awards
- 1989 Duke Sports Hall of Fame inductee

Wayne Harper Ambler (November 8, 1915 – January 3, 1998) was an American professional baseball player whose career spanned six seasons, including three in Major League Baseball with the Philadelphia Athletics (1937–1939). Over his career in the majors, Ambler player second base and shortstop. He also played in the minor leagues. Ambler played for the Class-A Williamsport Grays (1939), the Double-A Jersey City Giants (1940) and the Double-A Indianapolis Indians (1941). Ambler made his major league debut on June 4, 1937, after never playing in the minors, a rare feat. During his major league career, Ambler compiled a batting average of .224 with 175 hits, 39 doubles, two triples, 73 runs batted in (RBIs) and four stolen bases in 271 games played.

Ambler was discovered in 1933 by an amateur baseball umpire who introduced him to Connie Mack, the manager of the Philadelphia Athletics at the time. Mack later introduced him to his friend and manager of the Duke Blue Devils baseball team, Jack Coombs, who persuaded Ambler to play baseball at Duke University. While attending Duke, Ambler's tuition was paid for by Mack. He graduated from that institution in 1937 with a Bachelor's Degree in business administration. In 1989, he was inducted in the Duke Sports Hall of Fame. Ambler entered military service in 1941 after the attack on Pearl Harbor and later reached the rank of Lieutenant fighting in World War II. Ambler did not return to professional baseball after returning home from service.

== Early life ==
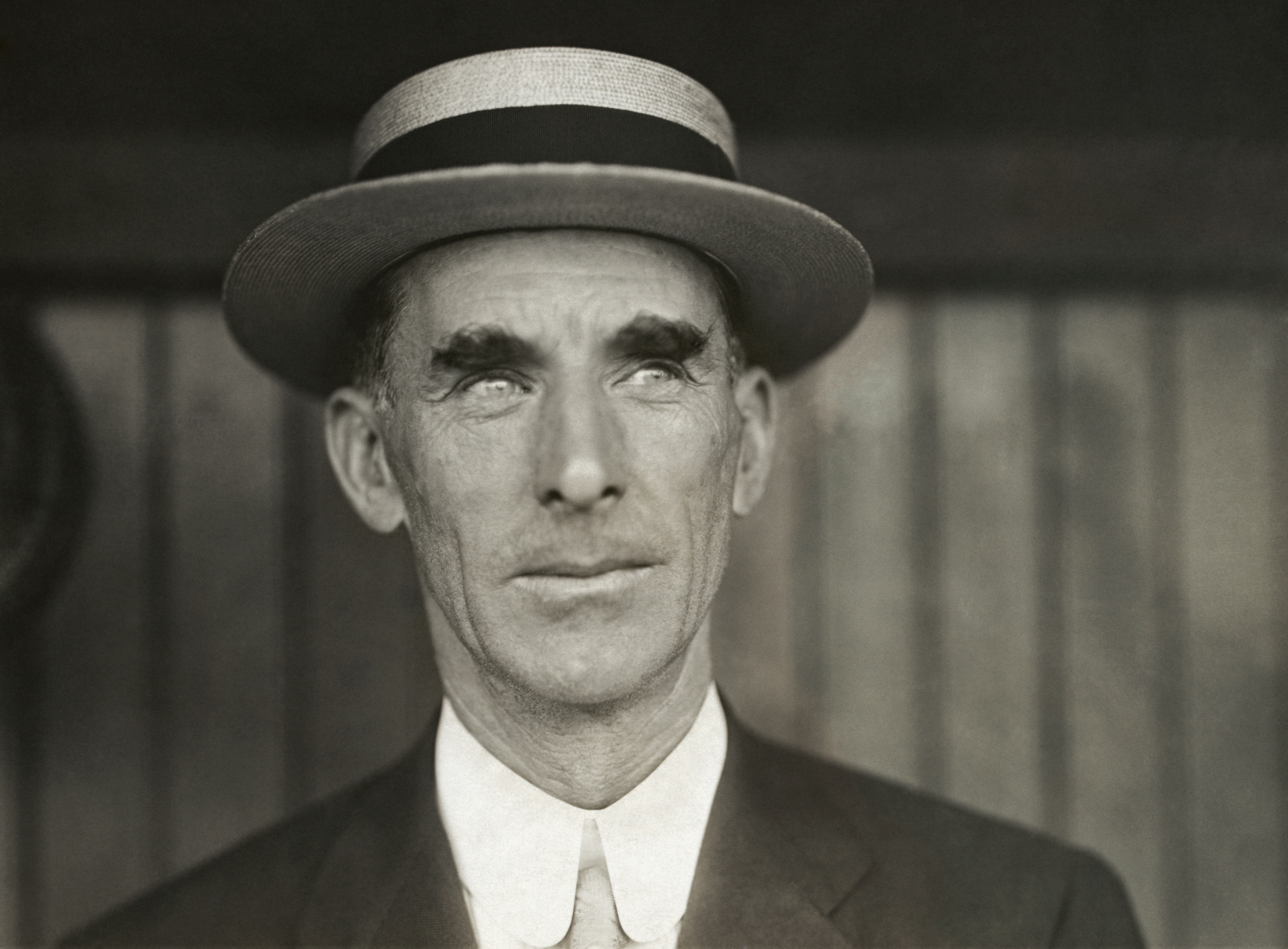
Connie Mack (pictured) paid Ambler's tuition while he attended Duke University.

Ambler was born on November 8, 1915, to Charles and Anne Ambler in Abington, Pennsylvania. Ambler was the youngest of three sisters and a brother. Graduating from Abington Senior High School in 1932, Ambler then enrolled at George School where he attended for a year and a half. From there, Ambler was discovered by amateur baseball umpire Jim Rumsey, a friend and unpaid scout for Connie Mack, the manager of the Philadelphia Athletics. Mack sent for Ambler to come to Shibe Park, the home baseball park of the Athletics, to take batting practice with the team. On Labor Day in 1933, Ambler was introduced to Jack Coombs, who was the Duke Blue Devils baseball manager at the time. When propositioned to join Coombs at Duke University, Ambler recalled that he told him that "[he] didn't know where the hell Duke was". Ambler stated that he had wanted to attend college, but was financially incapable.

Ambler accepted Coombs's invitation to go to Duke University with him. From there, Coombs set Ambler up with a job at the dining hall for meals and as a box office worker selling tickets and programs at football games. Mack stayed in contact with Ambler and even gave him money for tuition. After his first year, Ambler was asked by Mack if he wanted to return to Duke to continue his college education. Ambler said yes and Mack continued paying his tuition. During his senior season, Ambler batted .476. He was also the captain of the team that year, who were the conference champions with a 64–12 record. His batting average still stands as the second-highest in Blue Devil history. During the summers, Ambler earned $25 a week playing baseball in the Coastal Plain League. He graduated from Duke in 1937 with a Bachelor's Degree in business administration.

== Baseball career ==
=== Philadelphia Athletics ===
In 1937, Ambler signed with the Philadelphia Athletics, going directly to the major leagues. He made his major league debut on June 4, 1937, against the St. Louis Browns, getting one hit in four at-bats. In his first 16 plate appearances, Ambler got nine hits. During a game against the Chicago White Sox on June 7, Ambler jammed his finger, forcing him to leave the game. Ambler later sustained another, more severe injury. On July 18, in a double-header against the St. Louis Browns, Ambler collided head-to-head with Browns' catcher Ben Huffman after a play at second base. Both players were knocked unconscious at the time of the injury. On the train to Cleveland after the game, Ambler complained that his jaw felt sore and doctors took x-rays the next morning to find that he had suffered a break on his jaw. Ambler recalled in a 1997 interview that he "didn't remember a thing" after sustaining the initial injury. He was sent back home to recover, but within six weeks he was back on the Athletics roster. Ambler batted .216 with three runs, 35 hits, five doubles and 11 runs batted in (RBIs) in 56 games during his first season in the majors. On the defensive side, Ambler played all of his 56 games at second base, committing 12 errors in 268 total chances, giving him a .955 fielding percentage.

While the team was in spring training in 1938, Connie Mack, the manager of the Athletics at the time, alerted Ambler that he would report to the minor leagues for the start of the season. However, after he reported to the Williamsport Grays of the Eastern League on Mack's orders, Ambler received a telegraph from Mack telling him to report back to the majors. The reason being Mack needed a back-up shortstop going into the season after their other shortstop suffered an injury. Ambler later revealed that before Mack called on him to play shortstop, he had not played the position since high school. In 1938, Ambler's contract was worth US$1,500. Due to his financial situation, Ambler was forced to ride the bus and subway to Shibe Park from his family's house. On May 13, 1938, in a game against the New York Yankees, Ambler went five-for-five, a career high single-game hits total. On the season, Ambler batted .234 with 42 runs, 92 hits, 21 doubles, two triples and 38 RBIs in 120 games played. Unlike the season before, Ambler played the majority of the season at shortstop (116 games), while still playing limited time at second base (four games). In 1939, Ambler re-signed with the Athletics and signed a contract worth US$2,500. During the season, he batted .211 with 15 runs, 48 hits, 13 doubles and 24 RBIs.

=== Later career ===
After the 1939 season, the Athletics sold Ambler to the New York Giants, who assigned him to the Jersey City Giants of the International League for the 1940 season. With Jersey City, he batted .218 with 46 hits, 14 doubles and one home run in 83 games played. Ambler was used as a second baseman with Jersey City, playing 48 games at that position and committing seven errors in 233 total chances. In 1941, the Giants traded Ambler for pitcher Milt Shoffner who was a member of the Cincinnati Reds. Ambler attended spring training with the Reds that season and was assigned to the Double-A Indianapolis Indians for the regular season. In his final season in professional baseball, Ambler batted .245 with 126 hits, 10 doubles, three triples and two home runs in 139 games played. The Indians used Ambler as a shortstop, playing all of his 139 games at that position, committing 31 errors in 702 total chances.

== Military career ==
Ambler enlisted in the United States Navy in 1941 and served in World War II. He stated that he was prompted to do so after the attack on Pearl Harbor. Ambler operated guns on liberty ships. Amber explained, "I was a gunnery officer on a merchant ship. What they called 'armed guard' service. They put a Navy gunnery officer and 26 Navy gunners on these merchant ships. All we had to do was man the guns and defend the ship. I was in both oceans, but mostly the Atlantic." Ambler fought in Normandy and took part in the Battle of the Bulge in Antwerp. He was waiting stationed in the Philippines while his ship waited orders when Japan surrendered.

== Later life ==
After completing his four-year service in the United States Navy, Ambler returned to his home-town of Abington, Pennsylvania. Ambler was in talks with the Philadelphia Phillies about making a return to the majors before World War II, but after the war, he retired from professional baseball. At home, Ambler worked as a truck driver and played semi-professional baseball. During his semi-pro career, Ambler made US$25 a game and sometimes played against Negro league teams. Ambler also coached Little League Baseball, including a 1960 all-star team featuring Reggie Jackson. In 1988, he retired as a truck driver. On January 3, 1998, Ambler died in Ponte Vedra Beach, Florida, at the age of 82.

== Personal ==
Ambler married Sara Bird on November 26, 1939, and with her, fathered two children; Sally Ann, born 1943 and Wayne Hunter, born 1947.
