= Frank Wild Holdsworth =

English orthopaedic surgeon

Sir Frank Wild Holdsworth FRCS (22 September 1904 – 11 December 1969) was an English orthopaedic surgeon remembered for pioneering work on rehabilitation of spinal injury patients. He described the Holdsworth fracture of the spine in 1963.

== Biography ==
Holdsworth was born and brought up in Bradford, Yorkshire, the son of John William Holdsworth, a joiner and builder, and Martha Elizabeth Denison. He was baptised into the Wesleyan Methodist Church. He was educated at Bradford Grammar School. He studied medicine at Downing College, Cambridge, where he had won an exhibition, and St. George's Hospital Medical School. He qualified MRCS, LRCP in 1929, and was awarded FRCS in 1930 and M. Chir in 1935.

On his return to Yorkshire, he worked at the Sheffield Royal Infirmary, becoming consultant orthopaedic surgeon there, and at the Sheffield Children's Hospital, in 1937. He established the orthopaedic and accident service in Sheffield, and later developed the registrar rotation system which has become standard in the United Kingdom.

His interest in trauma surgery, which stemmed from working in a highly industrialised area, led to his becoming one of the first surgeons in the United Kingdom to develop rehabilitation for spinal injury patients under the aegis of the Miners' Welfare Commission. He visited the United States and Canada to study paraplegia which was common after coal mining accidents. Paraplegia remained an interest throughout his career, and he campaigned to establish a spinal unit at Lodge Moor Hospital in Fulwood, South Yorkshire.

He became President of the British Orthopaedic Association, Senior Vice President of the Royal College of Surgeons of England, and an Honorary Fellow of the American College of Surgeons. He received a knighthood in 1968, and became professor at the University of Sheffield in 1969. He died suddenly while in London later that year.
