= Hand deformity =

- Specialty: Plastic surgery

A hand deformity is a disorder of the hand that can be congenital or acquired. An example is Madelung's deformity.

== See also ==
- Acquired hand deformity
