= Holdsworth fracture =

- Specialty: Orthopedics

In medicine the Holdsworth fracture is an unstable fracture dislocation of the thoraco lumbar junction of the spine. The injury comprises a fracture through a vertebral body, rupture of the posterior spinal ligaments and fractures of the facet joints.

The injury was described by Frank Wild Holdsworth in 1963. He described the mechanism of this injury as a flexion-rotation injury, and said that the unstable fracture dislocation should be treated by fusion of the two affected vertebrae.

== See also ==
- Busch fracture
