= Albert Hoffa =

German surgeon (1859–1907)

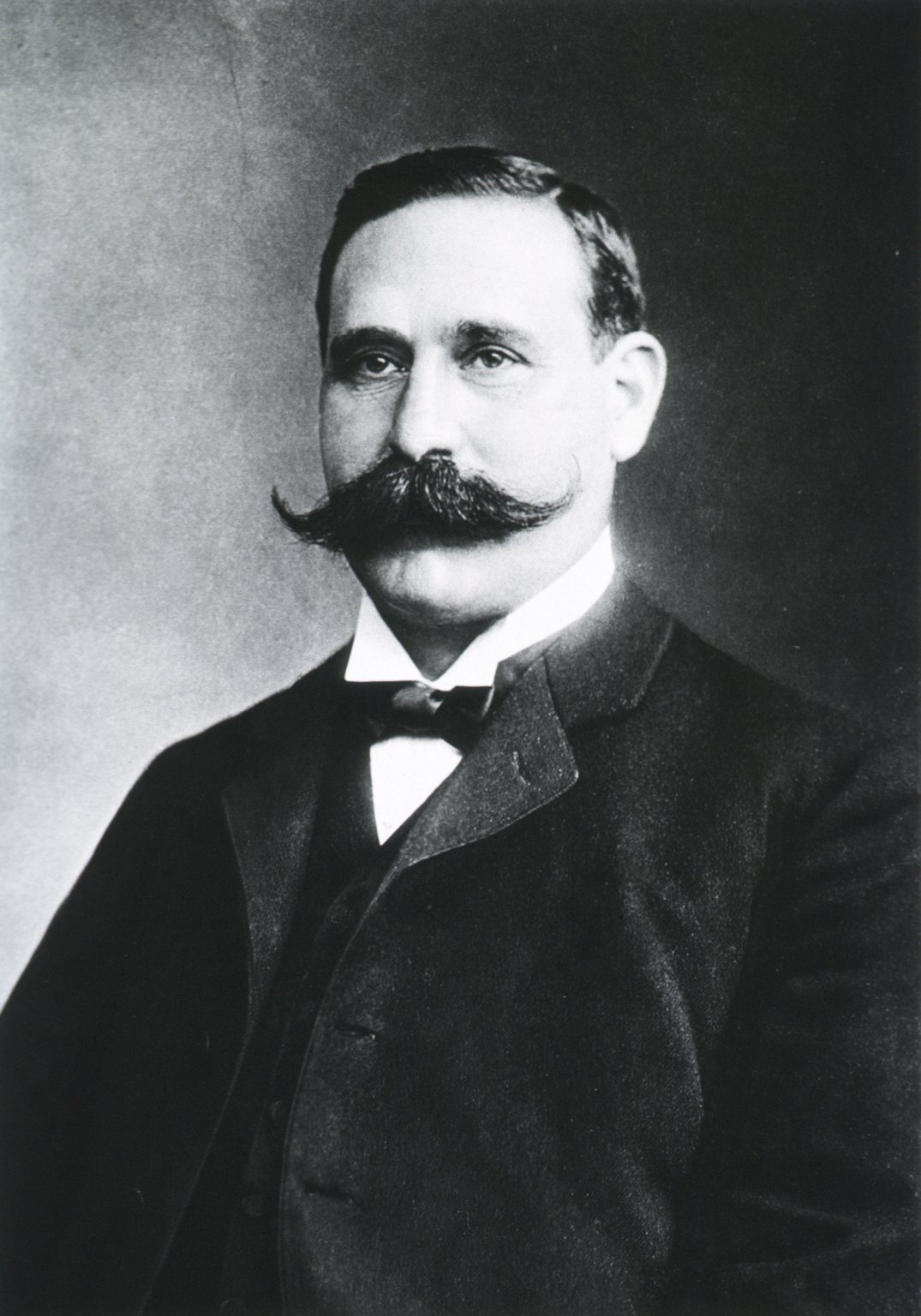
- Born: 31 March 1859
- Died: 31 December 1907 (aged 48)
- Education: Marburg University; University of Freiburg

Albert Hoffa (31 March 1859 – 31 December 1907) was a German surgeon, orthopedist and physiotherapist born in Richmond, Cape of Good Hope.

== Education ==
He studied medicine at Marburg University and the University of Freiburg, earning his doctorate with a thesis on nephritis saturnina (lead nephropathy).

== Career ==
In 1886, he opened a private clinic for orthopedics, physiotherapy and massage in Würzburg, where in 1895 he became an associate professor at the university. In 1902 he succeeded Julius Wolff (1836-1902) at the department of orthopedics in Berlin.

Hoffa is remembered for introducing an operation for congenital hip dislocations (1890), as well as for developing a system of massage therapy (Hoffa system). His name is further associated with an anatomical structure, Hoffa's fat pad, and a condition affecting it, known as "Hoffa's fat pad disease", characterized by chronic knee pain primarily beneath the patella.

In 1892 he founded the journal Zeitschrift für orthopädische Chirurgie.

== Selected writings ==
- Lehrbuch der Fracturen und Luxationen für Ärzte und Studierende, 1888 - Textbook of fractures and luxations for physicians and students.
- Lehrbuch der orthopädischen Chirurgie, 1891 - Textbook of orthopedic surgery.
- Technik der Massage, 1893 - Technique of massage.
- Atlas und Grundriss der Verbandlehre, 1897 - Atlas and outline of the teaching association.
- Die orthopädische Literatur, 1905 - Orthopedic literature.

== See also ==
- Hoffa fracture
- Busch-Hoffa fracture
