= Busch fracture =

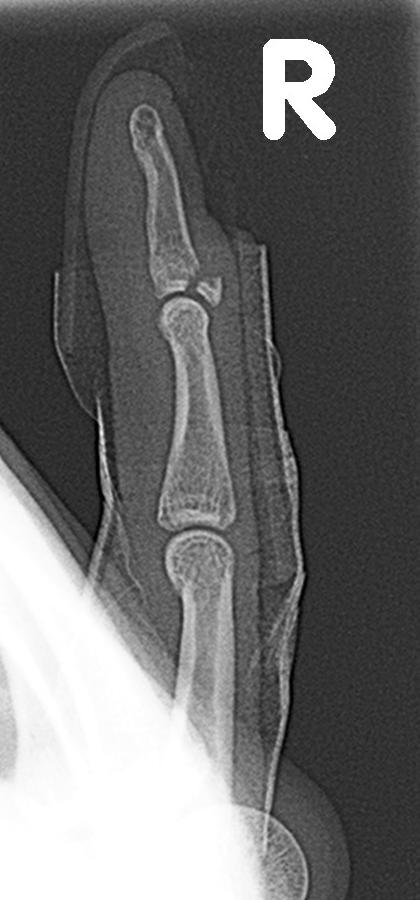
- Fracture of the dorsal base of the distal falange by extensor tendon avulsion (Busch fracture)
- Specialty: Orthopedic

In medicine a Busch fracture is a type of fracture of the base of the distal phalanx of the fingers, produced by the removal of the bone insertion (avulsion) of the extensor tendon. Without the appropriate treatment, the finger becomes a hammer finger. It would correspond to the group B of the Albertoni classification. It is very common in motorcycle riders and soccer joggers, caused by hyperflexion when the tendon is exercising its maximum tension (the closed hand tightening the clutch lever or the brake lever).

The Busch fracture is named after Friedrich Busch (1844–1916), who described this type of fracture in the 1860s. Busch's work was drawn on by Albert Hoffa in 1904, resulting in it sometimes being called a "Busch-Hoffa fracture".

The mechanism of this injury can be described as an avulsion of the tendon fixed to the distal phalanx.

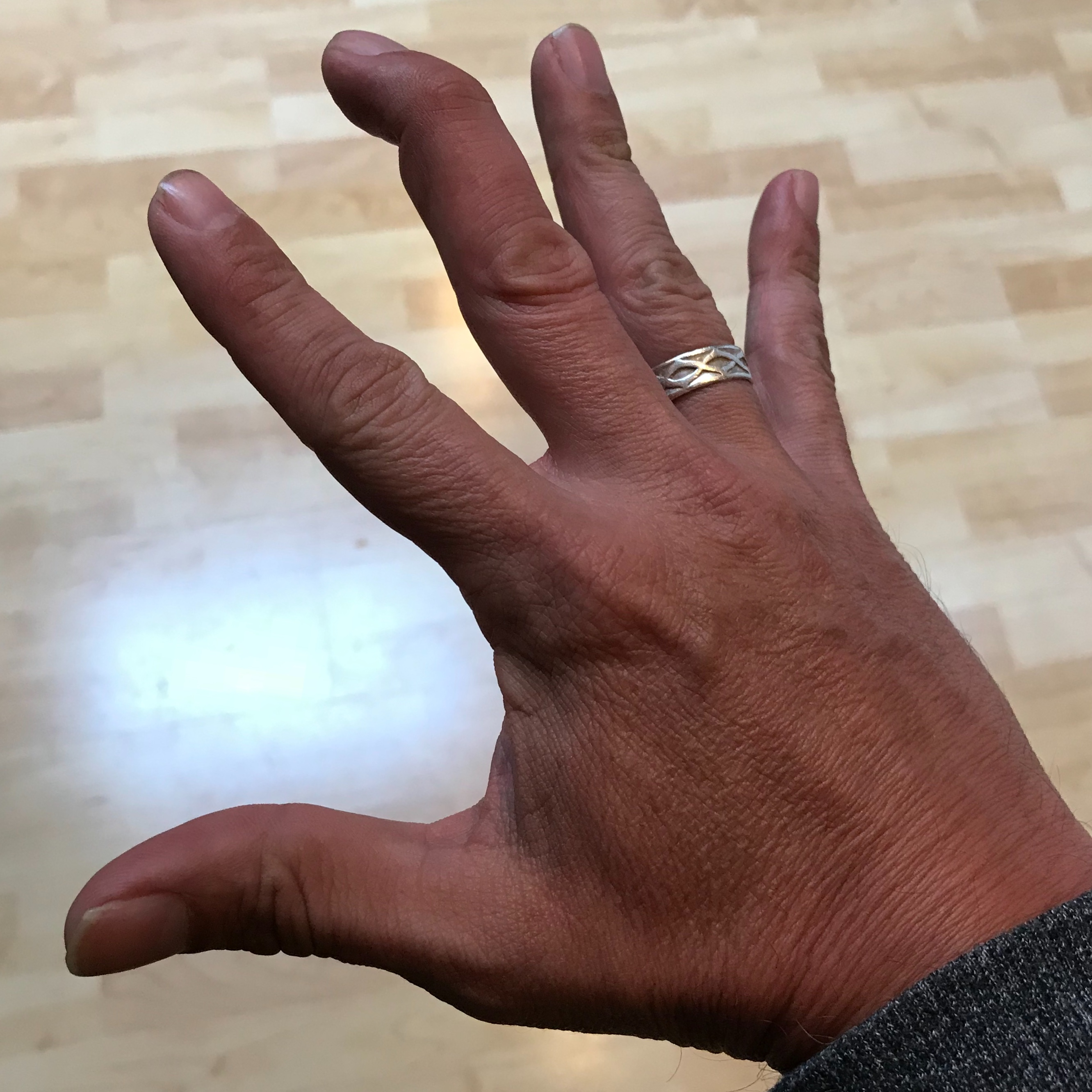
A Busch fracture, showing the characteristic mallet finger

Busch fracture mechanism: because the bit of bone attached to the tendon has broken off, the tendon can't extend the finger tip

== See also ==
- Holdsworth fracture
- Galeazzi fracture
