= DCAF8 =

Protein-coding gene in humans

Identifiers
- Aliases: DCAF8, GAN2, H326, WDR42A, DDB1 and CUL4 associated factor 8
- External IDs: OMIM: 615820; MGI: 91860; GeneCards: DCAF8
Available structures
PDB	Ortholog search: PDBe RCSB
PDB	List of PDB id codes 3I8E

Gene location (Human)
Chr.	Chromosome 1 (human)
Band	1q23.2	Start	160,215,715 bp
Band	1q23.2	End	160,262,549 bp

Gene location (Mouse)
Chr.	Chromosome 1 (mouse)
Band	1 H3|1 79.54 cM	Start	171,975,651 bp
Band	1 H3|1 79.54 cM	End	172,024,572 bp
RNA expression pattern
Bgee	Human / Mouse (ortholog); Top expressed in: right uterine tube; right lobe of thyroid gland; gastric mucosa; body of pancreas; sural nerve; left lobe of thyroid gland; right hemisphere of cerebellum; right ovary; Achilles tendon; left ovary / Top expressed in: neural layer of retina; muscle of thigh; ventricular zone; dentate gyrus of hippocampal formation granule cell; zygote; aortic valve; ascending aorta; right kidney; spermatocyte; primary oocyte; More reference expression data
BioGPS	n/a
Gene ontology
Molecular function	protein binding
Cellular component	nucleoplasm; mitochondrion; cytosol; cytoplasm; Cul4-RING E3 ubiquitin ligase complex; nucleus
Biological process	post-translational protein modification; protein ubiquitination
Sources:Amigo / QuickGO
Orthologs
Databases	NCBI: entry; OMA: entry
Species	Human	Mouse
Entrez	50717	98193
Ensembl	ENSG00000132716	ENSMUSG00000026554
UniProt	Q5TAQ8; Q5TAQ9	Q8N7N5
RefSeq (mRNA)	NM_015726	NM_153555; NM_001357204
RefSeq (protein)	NP_056541	NP_705783; NP_001344133
Location (UCSC)	Chr 1: 160.22 – 160.26 Mb	Chr 1: 171.98 – 172.02 Mb
PubMed search
- Wikidata
View/Edit Human	View/Edit Mouse

DDB1 and CUL4 associated factor 8 is a protein that in humans is encoded by the DCAF8 gene.

== Function ==
This gene encodes a WD repeat-containing protein that interacts with the Cul4-Ddb1 E3 ligase macromolecular complex. Multiple alternatively spliced transcript variants have been found for this gene. [provided by RefSeq, Jul 2009].
