= Jammed finger =

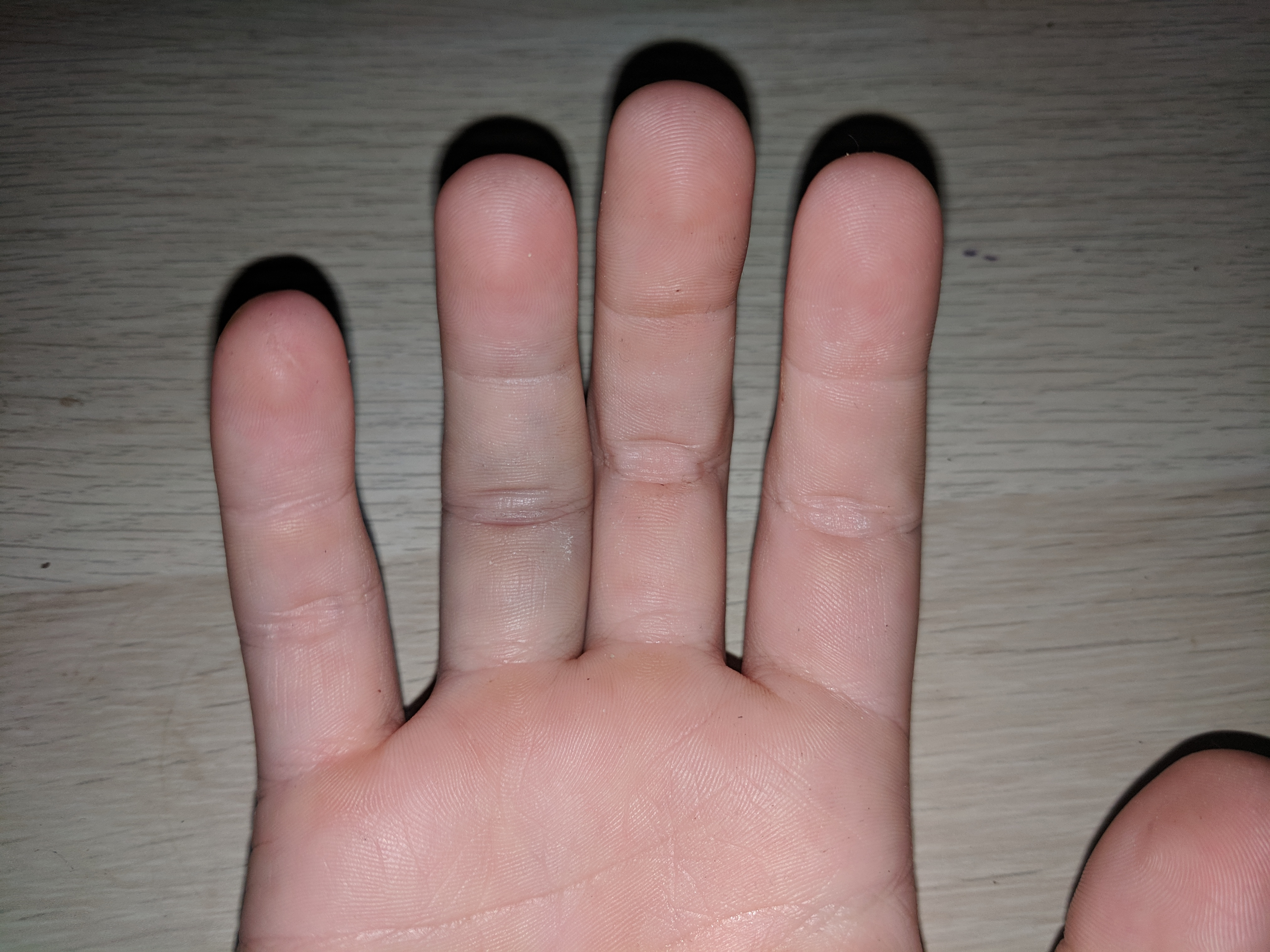
- Jammed ring finger with minor bruising two days after injury
- Symptoms: Swelling, pain, limited range of motion
- Types: Sprain, dislocation, fracture
- Causes: Axial loading to the finger
- Diagnostic method: Examination, X-rays
- Treatment: Dependent on injury severity

Jammed finger is a term used to describe various types of finger joint injuries. It happens from a forceful impact originating at the tip of the finger directed towards the base. This type of directional force is called axial loading. It occurs most often when the finger is fully extended. This can stretch or strain the ligaments in the joint beyond their normal limits. The severity of damage increases with the amount of force on the fingertip. In severe cases, injury to bone may occur. When experiencing a jammed finger, the extent of injury is not always obvious. Toes may become similarly jammed.

== Signs and symptoms ==
There are a variety of possible signs indicating a jammed finger. These depend on the severity of the injury. They may include swelling, reduced joint flexibility, pain, tenderness, and joint deformity. There may also be discoloration of the skin due to bruising. These symptoms usually persist for a few weeks. In some cases, the damage and its effects can last for years. Initial signs of a dislocation include abnormal bumps or projections at the joint. There may also be an audible popping noise when the injury occurs. Fractures are indicated by abnormal protrusions along the bone, where the bone itself appears split or twisted.

== Causes ==
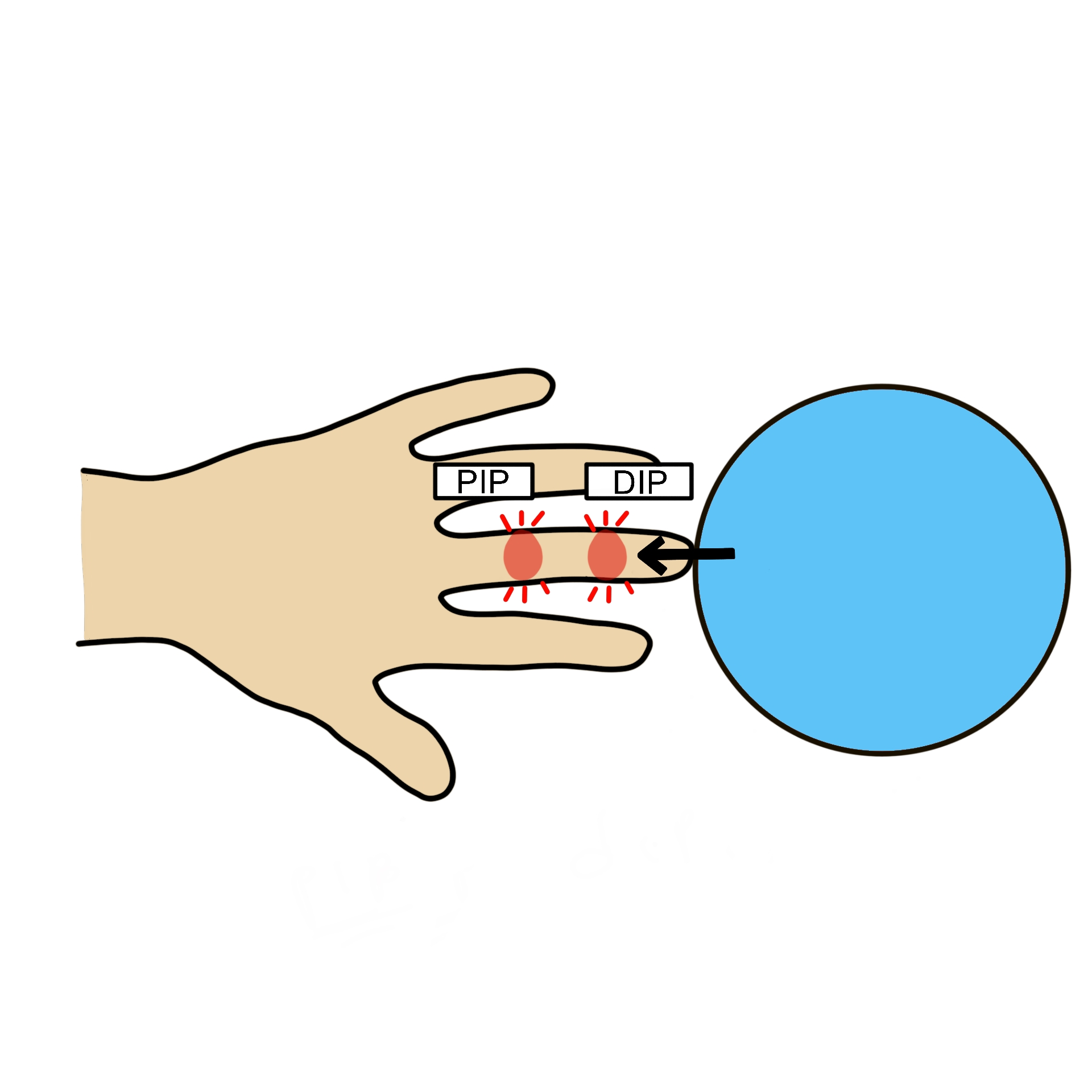
Axial loading of an object, commonly causing a jammed finger

Jammed fingers occur from axial loading at the tip of the finger. Any activity in which the fingers are outstretched could result in a jammed finger. This is particularly common in ball-related sports, where forceful contact with the ball and finger tip may occur. Contact sports are also a common risk factor due to collisions between players or the ground.

== Diagnosis ==
A jammed finger can generally be diagnosed by a physical examination. Bone or joint deformity may indicate potential dislocations or fractures. The basic structure of the finger includes three bones with joints in between each. The joint closest to the tip is the distal interphalangeal (DIP) joint. The next joint, moving closer to the hand, is the proximal interphalangeal (PIP) joint. The thumb differs by only having two bones and one interphalangeal joint.

The injured finger may be examined to determine where the pain is worst. If the finger is sprained or dislocated, pain will be worse at the joint rather than the bone. Due to the risk of dislocations or fractures, X-rays should be conducted prior to testing joint stability. This allows for prior detection of a dislocation or fracture. It is recommended that a variety of views (lateral, oblique, and anteroposterior) are observed. In extremely painful cases, a digital nerve block may be done to better assess the finger. This is where anesthetic is injected to either side of the base of the affected finger to reduce pain.

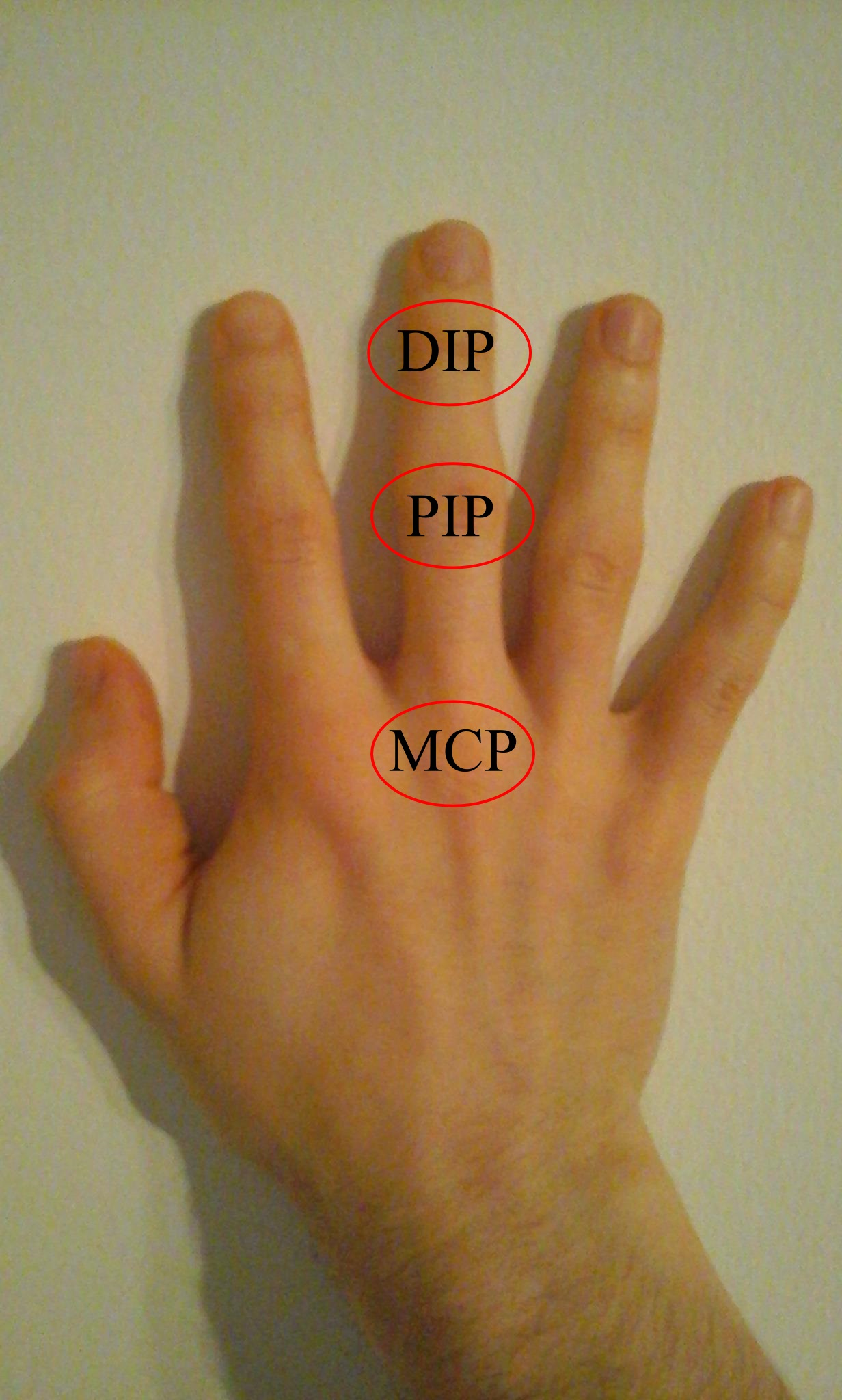
Joints of the finger

A jammed finger can be split into three categories; a sprain, a dislocation, or a fracture.

=== Sprains ===
Sprains are characterized by swelling of the joint, reduced range of motion, and pain. A finger sprain involves damage to the ligaments attached to the affected joint. Most often these include collateral ligaments. These are ligaments on the lateral and medial side of the finger joint. It is more common to injure both at the same time. Sprains may be assessed with maneuvers that stretch the joint in various directions to determine ligament stability.

Sprains can be split into sub-categories in order of increasing severity: first, second, and third degree. All three types will produce pain that is highest at the affected joint. First degree sprains involve a stretching of the ligament, without a tear. Since no tear is present, the stability of the joint remains intact and it would not feel loose. Second degree sprains involve a partial tear of the ligament. This would allow for increased freedom and mobility of the joint beyond its normal limits up to a certain point. A third degree sprain involves a complete tear of the ligament. In which case, the joint is no longer stabilized by the ligament and can move with ease. A lump may also be present at the joint in third degree sprains. Third degree sprains commonly result in a dislocation of the finger.

Injuries that force the finger towards the back of the hand may cause damage to the volar plate. This is a ligament on the palm side of the hand that prevents hyperextension. Volar plate damage may be assessed by pressing the finger bones from the back towards the palm. If either individual bone of the affected joint moves freely towards the palm, it is indicative of a tear. Tears of the volar plate may lead to an avulsion fracture – when a piece of bone is pulled off with the ligament. This is due to the thickness and strength of the ligament. To rule out an avulsion fracture, x-rays are frequently utilized in evaluation of suspected volar plate tears. Volar plate avulsions are most evident on lateral views.

=== Dislocations ===
Finger bones and joints

DIP dislocations are much less common than PIP dislocations. This is thought to be due to the increased stability of the DIP joint, though not for certain. Dislocations can be categorized based on the direction that the fingertip moves in relation to the knuckle. If in the direction of the palm, it is a volar dislocation. If in the direction of the back of the hand, it is a dorsal dislocation. If in the direction to either side, it is a lateral dislocation. Of the three, dorsal dislocations are most common. Dorsal dislocations of the PIP commonly lead to volar plate damage.

Dislocations are often visually obvious due to joint deformity. Therefore, x-rays may or may not be utilized in the diagnosis of a suspected dislocation. Though, they can provide feedback on post-reduction status if attempted prior to formal medical evaluation. Dislocations may also be complicated by a tandem fracture. These cases may necessitate a visit to a hand surgeon for surgery.

DIP dislocations may also involve a complete tear of the extensor digitorum tendon. This tendon is part of a muscle that straightens the tip of the finger. If left untreated, this may lead to permanent inability to straighten the finger at the affected DIP joint. This particular type of injury is known as mallet finger. It too, is commonly associated with an avulsion fracture. It is a variation of a jammed finger, where the extensor tendons on the back of the finger are damaged. Mallet finger occurs in similar situations as a jammed finger. The tendon that extends the tip of the finger is torn due to trauma causing it to flex beyond normal range. It is characterized by a difficulty extending the finger or opening the hand. Symptoms common to jammed fingers are likely, though a painless mallet finger is not uncommon.

=== Fractures ===
Fractures are instances where the bone's structural integrity has been compromised. If a jammed finger produces a fracture, pain will be greatest at the bone as opposed to the joint. There may also be visual deformation of the bone itself. As with any skeletal injury, an x-ray can be conducted to verify the presence of a fracture. The distal phalanx is especially vulnerable to avulsion fractures. These avulsion fractures are common following a first time dislocation of the DIP.

== Treatment ==
Treatment of jammed fingers depends upon the type and severity of injury as well as stability.

=== Sprains ===
Care for sprains involves restricting digit mobility using a splint. The splint should be used for no more than three weeks or else there is risk of decreased joint range of motion. The splint should be worn at all times. The skin under the splint should be carefully observed during the duration of its use. This is done to monitor for possible skin damage or allergy to splinting materials. When removing the splint to assess the skin underneath, it is important that the finger remains in the splinted position. If no splints are easily available, buddy taping can be done. This is where the affected digit is taped to an adjacent finger to provide support. The limiting of motion helps to reduce ligament stress which is important in the early stages of healing. If the sprain occurs during a sporting event and seems mild, this method may allow the player to resume activity. Formal medical follow up is still recommended following completion of play. If swelling persists, anti-inflammatory medications may be utilized. Third degree sprains may require surgery if X-rays show poor joint structure or if laxity is present at rest.

=== Dislocations ===
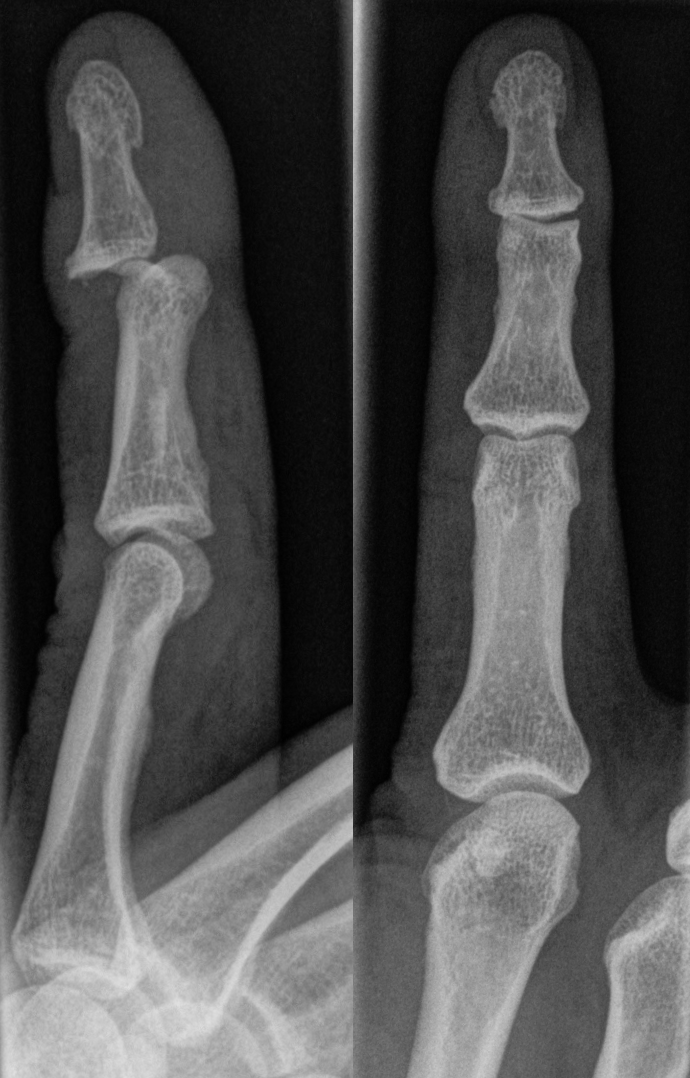
DIP Dislocation

Dislocations are treated differently depending on the type. Regardless, closed reduction is the usual first step. This is where the joint is realigned without the need for surgery. For a dorsal dislocation, the fingertip is pulled while applying palmar pressure to the distal bone and dorsal pressure to the proximal bone. Following reduction, movement of the joint should be tolerable. Repeat X-rays are standard to confirm proper joint setting. Next, the finger is splinted while slightly bent to prevent over-extension of the joint. If hyperextending the joint is too painful or causes the skin to turn pale, the finger should be splinted straight. Dorsal PIP and DIP dislocations should be splinted for 2–3 weeks. Limited movement of the finger is recommended soon after injury to limit loss of range of motion.

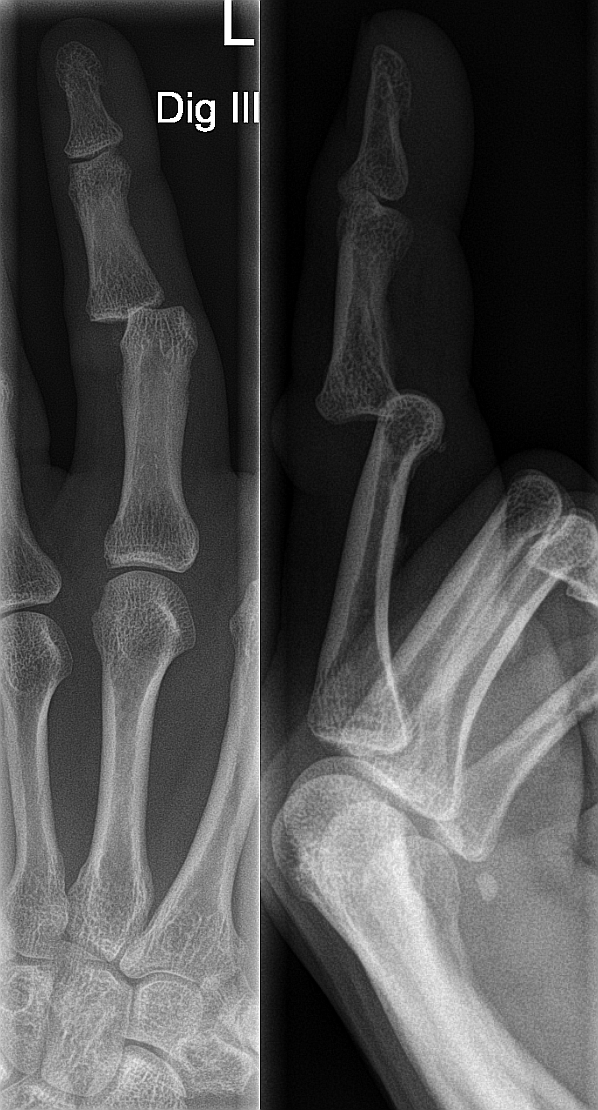
PIP Dislocation

For volar dislocation reduction, the finger should be slightly bent at the PIP joint to help relax the tendons. With the palm of the hand facing down, the fingertip is pulled while applying upward pressure to the bone distal to the affected joint. After reduction, tendons may be tested by having the patient flex and extend the finger. Due to swelling and pain, a full range of motion is unlikely. If no active flexion or extension can be done, there is a high possibility of tendon rupture. Similar to dorsal dislocations, repeat X-rays should be done to confirm successful reduction. Unlike dorsal dislocations, the joint is regularly splinted at full extension. If no avulsion fracture is present, the splint should be in place for six weeks. An extra four to six weeks of splinting should be done during sporting activities. If there is an avulsion fracture, open reduction and internal fixation may be required. This is when the bone is put back into place via surgery.

Lateral dislocations often require open reduction, though closed reduction can be attempted. Closed reduction is attempted with the wrist extended and finger flexed at the base. The dislocated bone is then pushed back towards the joint. After reduction, X-rays are used to assess joint stability and a straight splint is placed for 2–3 weeks. If closed reduction is initially difficult, it may be necessary to numb the joint to relax it and the individual. Open reduction may also be required in rare cases of dorsal and volar dislocations. If post-reduction X-rays of the dislocation show misalignment of the joint or bone, a fracture may be present. Such cases may also require surgery.

=== Fractures ===
Fractures involve the breaking of the bone. If a fracture is not treated properly, the bone may experience malunion — improper healing. This may result in post-traumatic arthritis. Additional surgery may need to be conducted to properly treat a malunion. As with a dislocation, closed reduction is attempted before open reduction. The finger is then splinted to prevent further injury to the digit as it heals. Splint material and type varies depending on the reduction conducted. Splint-assisted healing is most dependent on patient compliance. Splinting for less than the recommended duration may lead to less effective healing and loss of function.

Following any necessary wrapping, splinting, and reduction, a rehabilitation period may be necessary. This can include stretching and strengthening programs to regain function. Range of motion exercises can help prevent long-term stiffness in the affected digit. Methods to reduce joint swelling may decrease the time taken to regain full range of motion. Examples of such techniques include massage and compressive wraps. An increased amount of swelling during the rehabilitation period is concerning. It may be a sign of an undiagnosed fracture or an overly aggressive rehab program.

== Prognosis ==
A jammed finger is usually cause for medical attention. Regardless of whether a dislocation or fracture is evident. Improperly treated injuries can cause lasting pain, stiffness, and other issues. The risk for arthritis is also increased if fractures are not addressed. Regular monitoring is recommended for proper healing and regain of function. Proper care and compliance with treatment increases the chances of full recovery.

== Prevention ==
The unpredictable nature of a jammed finger makes it difficult to prevent. Yet, it is possible to reduce risk in ball-related sports. Learning proper handling and catching techniques can help. Following an injury, the affected finger can be taped during high-risk activities to help prevent recurrence.
