= Nerve biopsy =

- ICD-9-CM: 04.11-04.12
- MedlinePlus: 003928

In medicine, a nerve biopsy is an invasive procedure in which a piece of nerve is removed from an organism and examined under a microscope. A nerve biopsy can lead to the discovery of various necrotizing vasculitis, amyloidosis, sarcoidosis, leprosy, metabolic neuropathies, inflammation of the nerve, loss of axon tissue, and demyelination.

Biopsy literally means an examination of tissue removed from a living body to discover the presence, cause, or extent of a disease.

A nerve biopsy may be necessary when a patient experiences numbness, pain, or weakness in places such as the fingers or toes. A nerve biopsy can help to determine the cause of such symptoms. The procedure is usually only performed when all other options have failed in determining the cause of a disease. It is an outpatient procedure that is performed under local anesthetic.

== Uses ==
A nerve biopsy can potentially find the cause of the numbness or pain experienced in the limbs. It can reveal if these symptoms are caused by damage to the myelin sheath, damage to the small nerves, destruction of the axon in the nerve cells or neuropathies.

== Procedure ==
A sample piece of a nerve is cut from an affected area. The three different types of nerve biopsies each employ a slightly different procedure. For each procedure, the patient is given a local anesthetic to numb the area to be operated on. The patient remains conscious throughout the procedure. The surgeon makes a small incision and removes part of the nerve before closing the incision. Once the nerve has been removed, it is sent to a laboratory for examination.

== Types ==
=== Sensory ===
For this procedure, a 1-inch patch of sensory nerve is removed from the ankle or shin, during which the patient may experience temporary or permanent numbness on the top or side of the foot.

=== Selective motor nerve ===
A nerve sample is taken from the inner thigh when a motor nerve is affected.

=== Fascicular ===
The nerve is exposed and separated, then given a small electrical impulse to help understand which nerve should be removed and examined.

== Risks ==
The most significant risk is long-term nerve damage and loss of sensation. Less significant risks include discomfort after the procedure, allergic reaction to the anesthetic, and infection.
