= Mallet finger =

Type of fracture

- Other names: Hammer finger, extensor tendon injury at the DIP joint, baseball finger
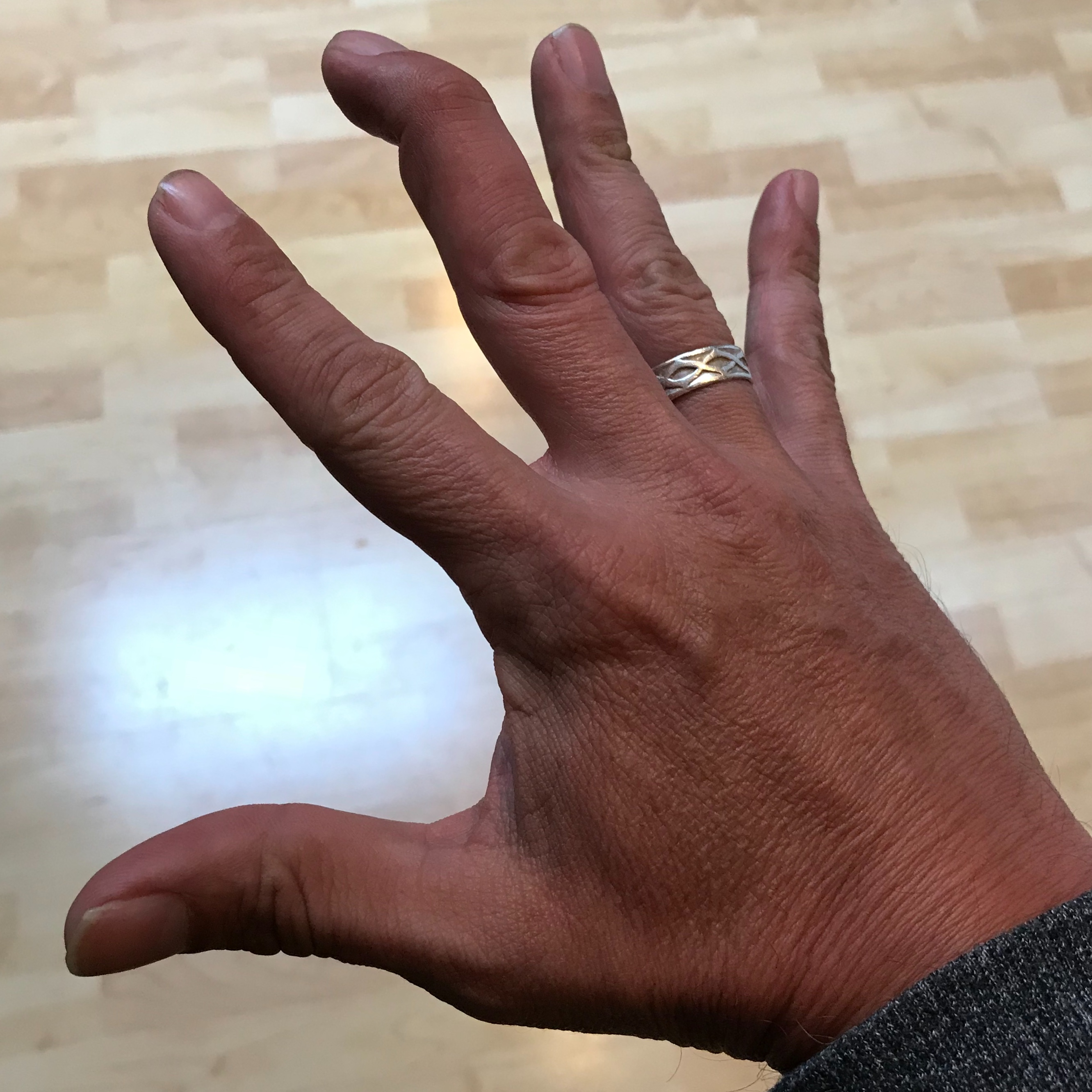
- Mallet finger of the middle finger. The tip of the finger bends downwards while the other fingers stay straight.
- Specialty: Emergency medicine, sports medicine, plastic surgery
- Symptoms: Inability to extend the finger tip, pain and bruising of the finger
- Causes: Trauma resulting in over bending of the finger tip
- Diagnostic method: Based on symptoms, X-rays
- Treatment: Splinting for 8 weeks, surgery
- Prognosis: 6 to 10 weeks for healing
- Frequency: Relatively common

A mallet finger, also known as hammer finger or PLF finger or Hannan finger, is an extensor tendon injury at the furthest away finger joint. This results in the inability to straighten the finger tip without pushing it. There is generally pain and bruising at the back of the furthest away finger joint.

A mallet finger usually results from overbending of the finger tip. This typically occurs when a ball hits an outstretched finger and jams it. This results in either a tear of the tendon or the tendon pulling off a bit of bone. The diagnosis is generally based on symptoms and supported by X-rays.

Treatment is normally with a splint that holds the fingertip straight continuously for 8 weeks. The middle joint is allowed to move. This should commence within a week of the injury. If the finger is bent during these weeks, healing may take longer. If a large piece of bone has been torn off, surgery may be recommended. Without proper treatment, the finger may be permanently deformed.

== Diagnosis ==
The diagnosis is typically based on symptoms and supported by X-rays. The injury can be accompanied by swelling and ecchymosis.

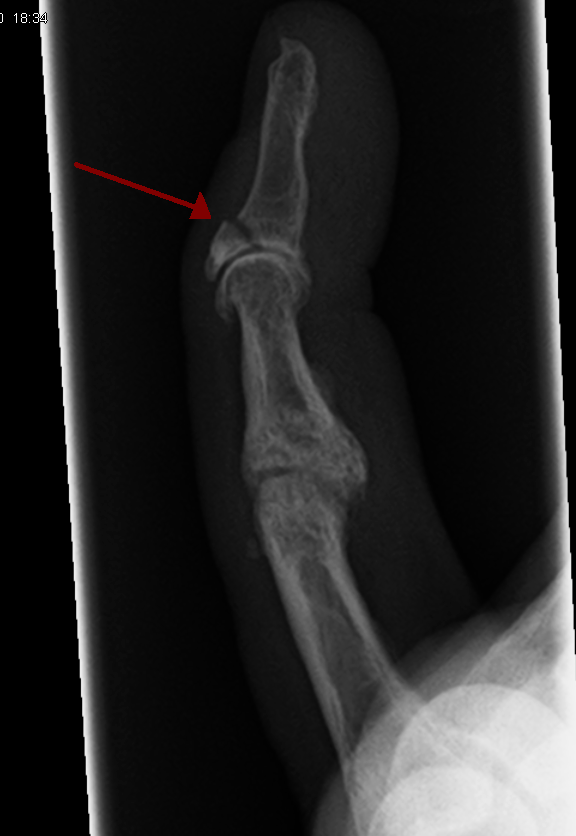
X-ray showing fracture at the insertion of the extensor tendon

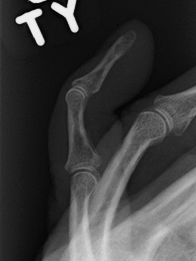
A mallet finger without an associated fracture

== Treatment ==
The management goal is to restore extension of the joint. Treatment is normally with a splint that holds the first joint of the finger straight continuously for 8 weeks. This should begin within a week of the injury. The splint may be worn just at night for a few additional weeks after this. The splint acts to immobilize flexing of the joint.

Surgery generally does not improve outcomes. It may be required if the finger cannot be straightened by pushing on it or the break has pulled off more than 30% of the joint surface. Surgery may be preferred over the use of a splint if a child is non-compliant. If the problem has been present for a long time, surgery may also be required. An open fracture may be another reason. Surgery will put the finger in a neutral position and drill a wire through the distal interphalangeal joint (DIP) to the proximal interphalangeal joint (PIP), forcing immobilization.

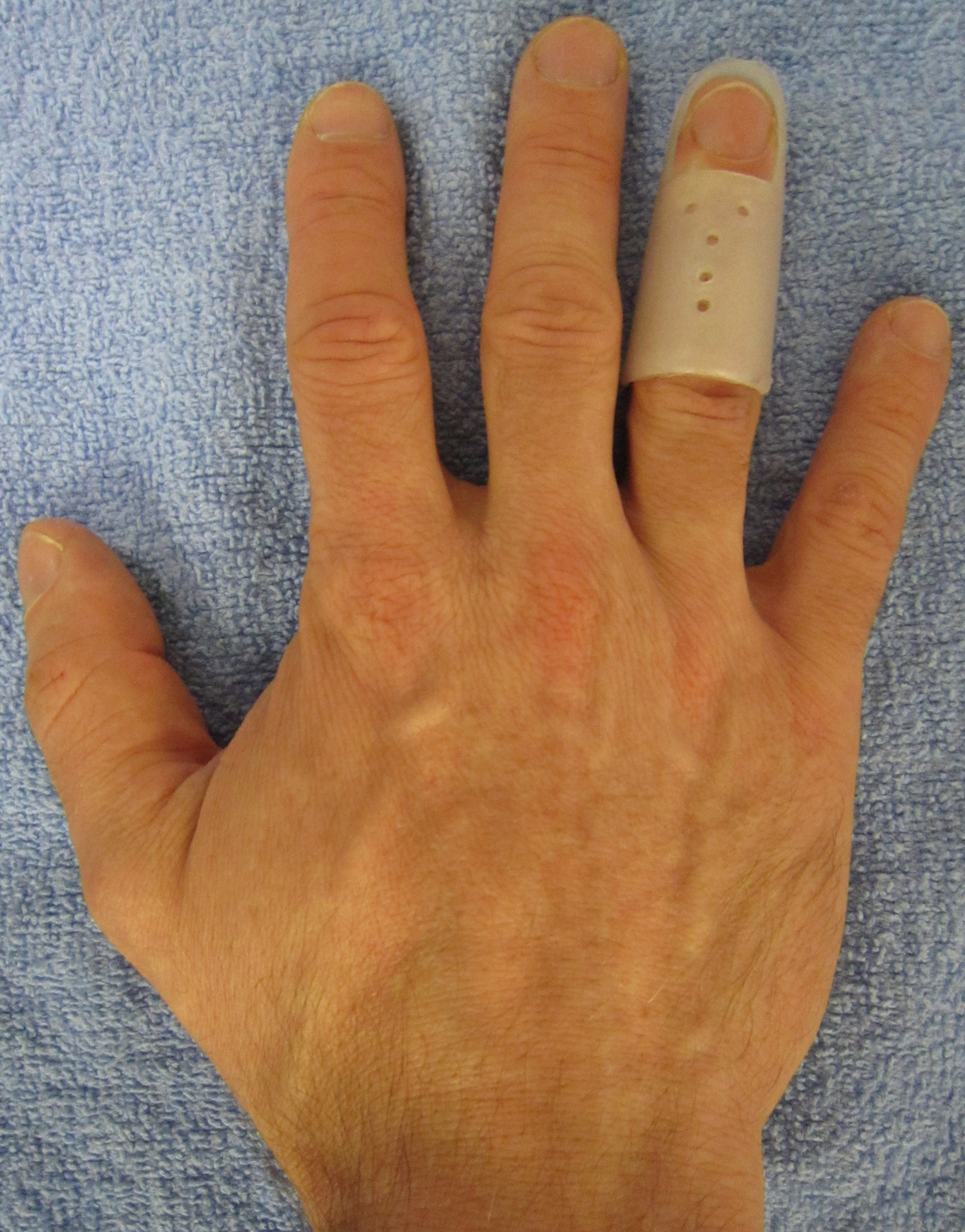
An example of a splint for mallet finger.

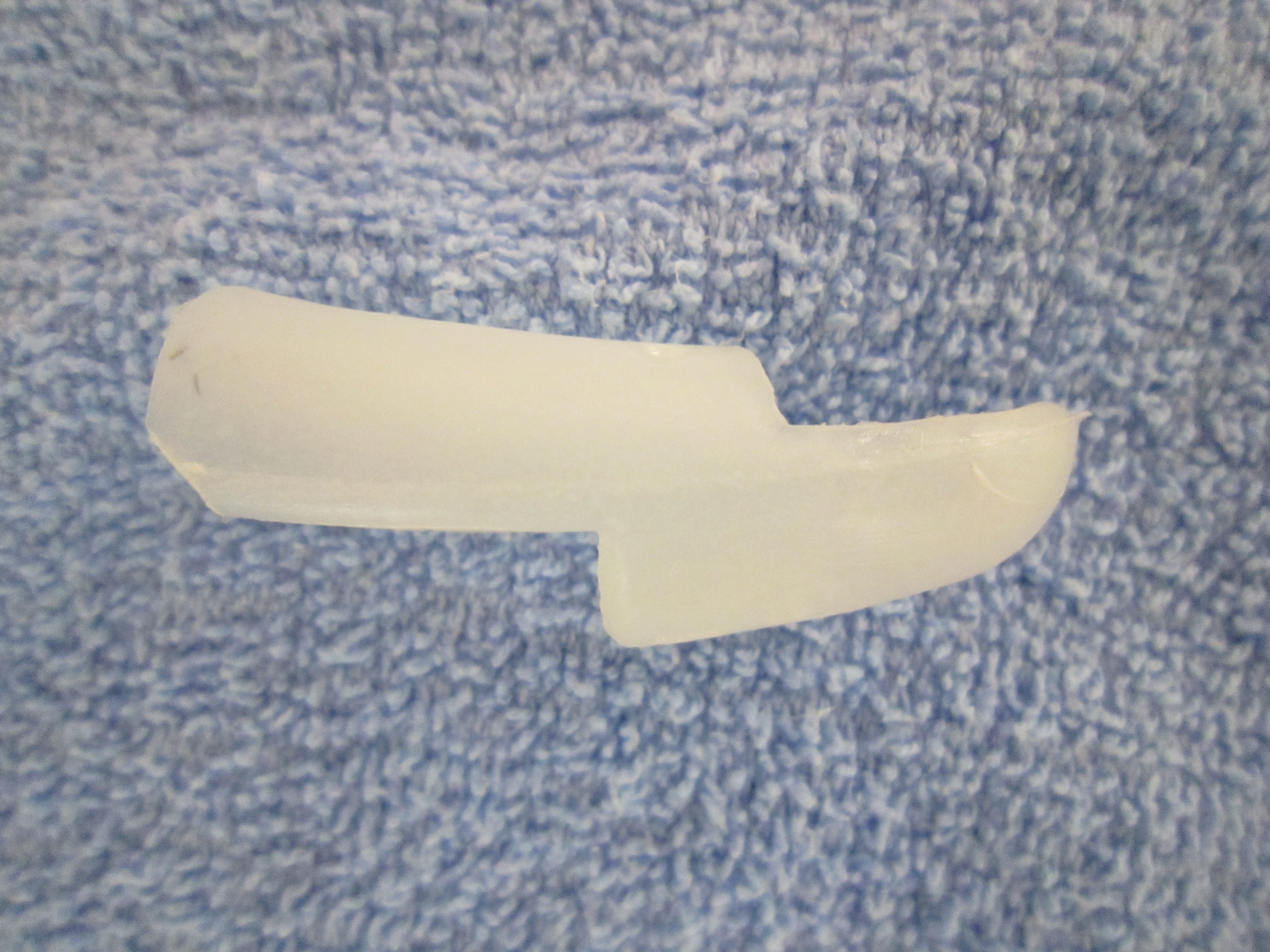
Lateral view of a splint for mallet finger. Note the lower side is open to let the second joint flex.

== See also ==
- Busch fracture
- Jersey finger
