= Cowboy polo =

Form of polo played mostly in the western United States

Cowboy polo is a variation of polo played mostly in the western United States. Like regular polo, it is played in chukkas (periods) with two teams on horses who use mallets to hit a ball through a goal. It differs from traditional polo in that five riders make up a team instead of four, western saddles and equipment are used, and the playing field is usually a simple rodeo arena or other enclosed dirt area, indoors or out. Also, instead of the small ball used in traditional polo, the players use a large red rubber medicine ball and use mallets with long fiberglass shafts and hard rubber heads.

== Horses ==
The horse breed most often used for cowboy polo is the American Quarter Horse, due to its agility. Unlike regular polo, where multiple horses are used within a single game, riders do not change horses between chukkas, but instead are only allowed two horses, and in some competitions are required to ride one horse throughout. This ability to compete with relatively few animals has given the sport its nickname, the "average man's" sport. Horses competing in cowboy polo are often older, experienced animals with steady dispositions who have come to understand the basic purpose of the game and can assist their riders.

== History ==
Cowboy polo originated in New Smyrna Beach, Florida, in 1952, where it was called Palmetto Polo. The name came from the mallet handles, which were made out of palm. It was renamed "cowboy polo" in 1959. As it came west, it was connected almost entirely to the membership of sheriff's posses, groups primarily dedicated to mounted search and rescue, consisting of deputized law enforcement volunteers. While participation was once limited to men only, women were admitted to the sport in the mid-1990s. It reached its peak of popularity during the 1970s, with clubs from Texas to Montana, as well as clubs in Australia. However, since then, cowboy polo has been in decline, with the national organization disbanding in 2005. Today, the sport is almost exclusively played in Montana. Even in Montana, where there were once 30 clubs, there are now only five.

== Rules ==
Though the sport has written rules, the most commonly enforced rule is unwritten: any rider who falls off his or her horse must buy beer for the entire team.

Teams consist of five players, with two horseback referees and two goal spotters. Riders are limited to two horses per game, though most players use one horse throughout. The game is played in four periods of 15 minutes each, called, as in regular polo, "chukkas." There are mandatory four-minute rest periods at the end of each chukka and a nine-minute break at half time. Each team is allowed four two-minute time outs during the game. Teams switch ends at each chukka.

The field is divided widthwise into four 50 feet (15 m) sections or zones, and one center zone of 60 feet (18 m). Each team has one player assigned to each zone with the goal of hitting the ball toward the opponents' goal. If a player crosses into another zone, the team loses control of the ball to the other team. The goal areas are each 20 feet (6.1 m) and located at each end of the arena. The arena is generally 120 feet (37 m) wide.

A goal made from the first zone is worth one point. Goals made from the second zone from the goal, without being touched by either player in the first zone is worth two points. An untouched goal from the center zone counts for three points. Balls knocked out of the field are returned to the spot where the ball exited the field and the opposing team takes control of the ball.

Unruly or disobedient horses may be asked to leave the field, as will players who endanger other players unnecessarily. Equipment failure during the game that presents a danger to a player or horse results in a safety time out called by the referee.

Safety is of paramount importance. There are 32 rules of play, including 11 types of personal fouls, including “reaching across an opposing player’s horse,” or “riding into and hitting an opposing player’s horse in front or back of the saddle with his/her horse’s front quarters, at greater than a 45-degree angle.”

== Equipment ==
The ball for cowboy polo is a red rubber medicine ball. The polo mallet has a maximum length of 60 inches (150 cm). It was traditionally made of cane but can be made of fiberglass. Saddles must be American western saddles or Australian stock saddles. Participants are strongly encouraged to have their horses wear exercise bandages or brushing boots. Use of a breast collar is optional. There are no specific rules for horse headgear, as long as the equipment is humane. Tie-downs are allowed, but officials may require the removal of any piece of equipment liable to cause discomfort to the horse.

For riders, hats or headgear is required. Most riders now wear some form of equestrian helmet or other protective headgear, such as a cricket helmet with a face guard. However, Western or Australian style felt hats may be worn. Extra protective clothing such as knee and shin guards, is optional, though they must not be hard or sharp edged to prevent injury to your opponent or his/her horse. Riders also must wear jeans, riding boots and a shirt in the specified club color.
