= Mummification (BDSM) =

Form of bondage

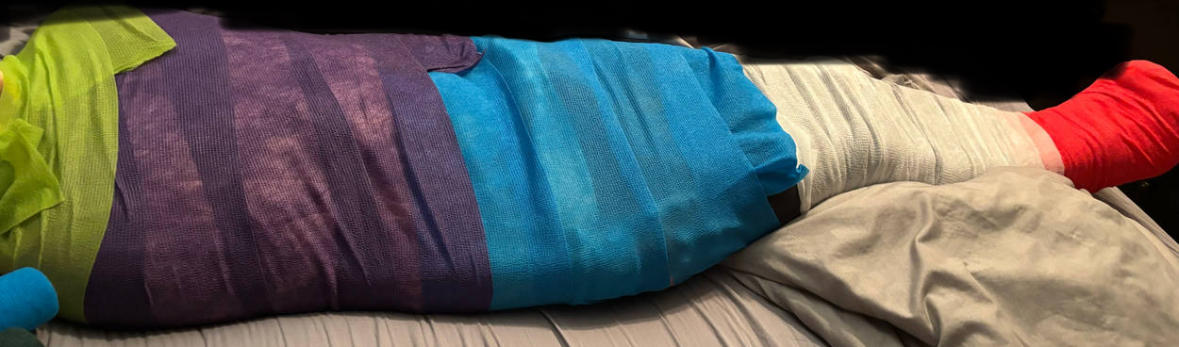
Mummification of the body using cohesive bandage

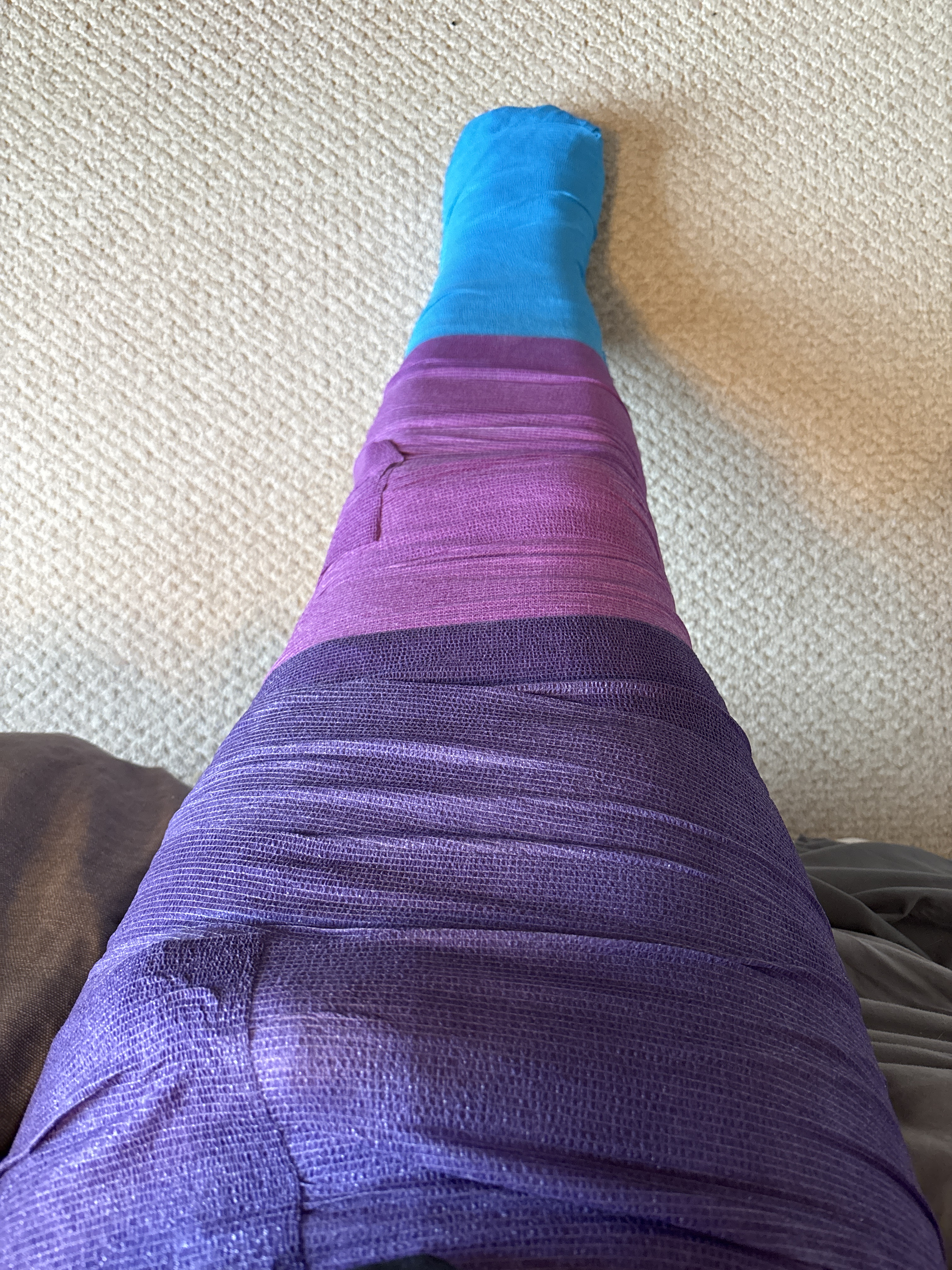
Example of self-bondage mummification using cohesive wrap to mummify the legs and feet

Mummification is a form of bondage in which a person is wrapped in some form of wrap in order to restrict their movement.
