= Caulkin =

Blunt projection on a horseshoe

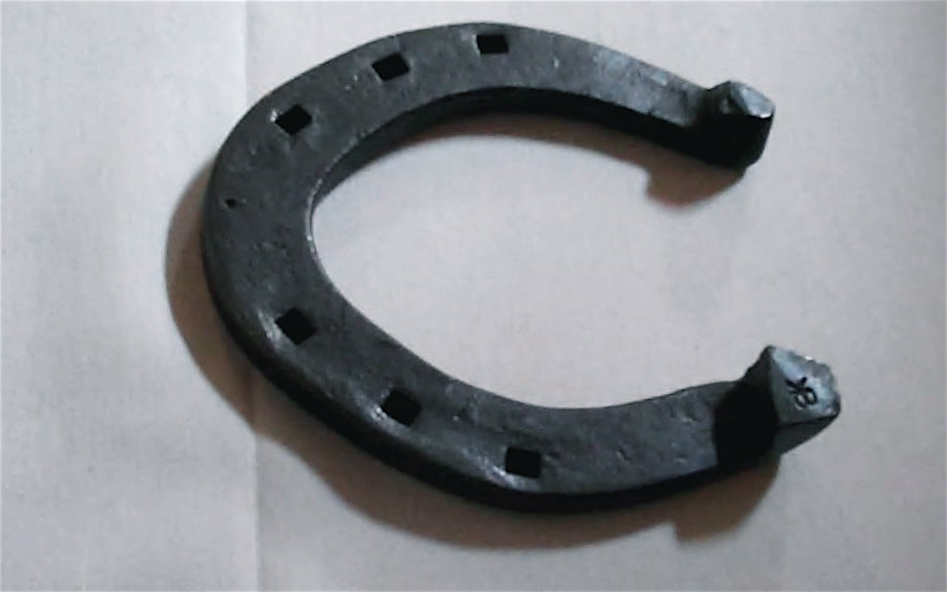
Heel calks on a horseshoe

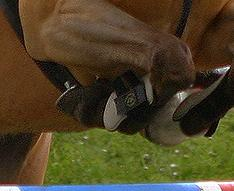
Screw-in-calks used on a show jumper.

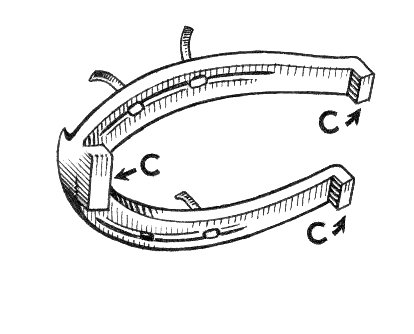
Calks (identified by the letter "C" on diagram) consist of spur-point and a shank to form an antislipping device.

A caulkin (Note: (or caulk; US spelling "calkin" or "calk") from the Latin calx (the heel)) is a blunt projection on a horseshoe or oxshoe that is often forged, welded or brazed onto the shoe. The term may also refer to traction devices screwed into the bottom of a horseshoe, also commonly called shoe studs or screw-in calks. These are usually a blunt spiked cleat, usually placed at the sides of the shoe.

== Use ==
Caulkins or studs improve a horse's balance and grip over uneven or slippery terrain, allowing the animal to move better and jump more confidently in poor footing. Screw in calks are most often seen in speed sports, such as eventing, polo, and show jumping, although they are sometimes used for dressage. Forged caulks of various styles are more often seen on race horses and working animals such as draft horses and some packhorses and trail horses, though in some areas they are still seen on field hunters and other riding horses that have to work in all weather and require extra traction, such as police horses.

== Designs ==
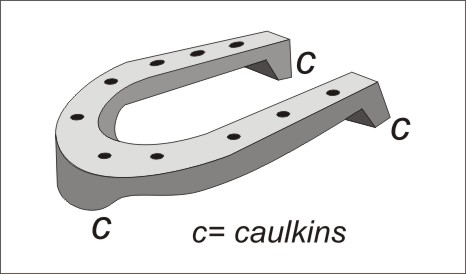

=== Permanent designs ===
Traditionally, the prongs of an elongated horseshoe (commonly not more than 1 3/4 inches or 44 millimetres) have tips bent at an acute angle opposite to the surface attached to the horses' hoof. Traditionally, a farrier employs a forge in hot-shoeing to heat the two heel prongs to red hot and bends them by hammering prongs over a right-angle to bend into an acute angle. Occasionally, another caulkin is on the toe of the shoe and integrally formed in the initial forging process.

For a horseshoe built as a concave caulk and wedge shoe, the 2 prongs differ: one prong ends with a caulkin, and the other prong ends with a wedge (with both facing downward to the ground). That caulk/wedge horseshoe is a traditional British hunting shoe, and it has been used to provide the horse with a sure-footed grip when working at a fast pace over uneven ground. The shapes of the caulkin and the wedge have been designed to provide hoof traction, meanwhile ensuring the horse's safety is not compromised. The caulk/wedge horseshoe design has been recognised by the Worshipful Company of Farriers as being an appropriate specimen horseshoe to be used for the diploma exam.

Another way caulkins are applied is for borium to be brazed onto the surface of the shoe. Usually borium is placed at the heels and toe, either in small knobs for maximum grip, or in small rough patches for extra traction and to prevent wear on the shoe.

== Screw-in calks ==
For use of screw-in calks or studs, horseshoes are "tapped", or drilled, on either heel of the shoe, so that different studs may be applied as needed and changed according to the footing conditions and the type of work performed by the horse. Therefore, a horse may have a maximum of 8 studs (2 per foot). Studs come in several sizes and types.

Screw-in calks or studs are popular in sport competition because they can be changed to adapt to different terrain. However, the size and design of stud must be carefully selected, as the wrong stud will be useless and can damage the horse's legs. Too little traction, and the horse may slip and possibly fall. Too much, and the horse is jarred, as his feet cannot naturally slip (which is a shock-absorption mechanism). Additionally, the more stud used, the greater chance the shoe may be pulled off. Usually, if there is doubt, it is considered best to slightly under-stud. In general, the faster the pace, the larger the stud will be used. Therefore, small studs are used for dressage and lower-level jumping or eventing, and larger studs are used for polo and upper-level eventing. Studs with more of a point are used for hard ground, and those that have more circumference are used in "heavier" footing, such as thick mud.

A hoof pick or horseshoe nail can help remove the plug prior to insertion of a screw-in stud. A special instrument called a T-tap is used to clean out the stud holes before the stud is screwed in, or it can be used to re-tap the stud hole if the threads are damaged. Additionally, a small metal brush can be used to help clean threads which are especially dirty. A wrench is used to tighten or loosen the studs.

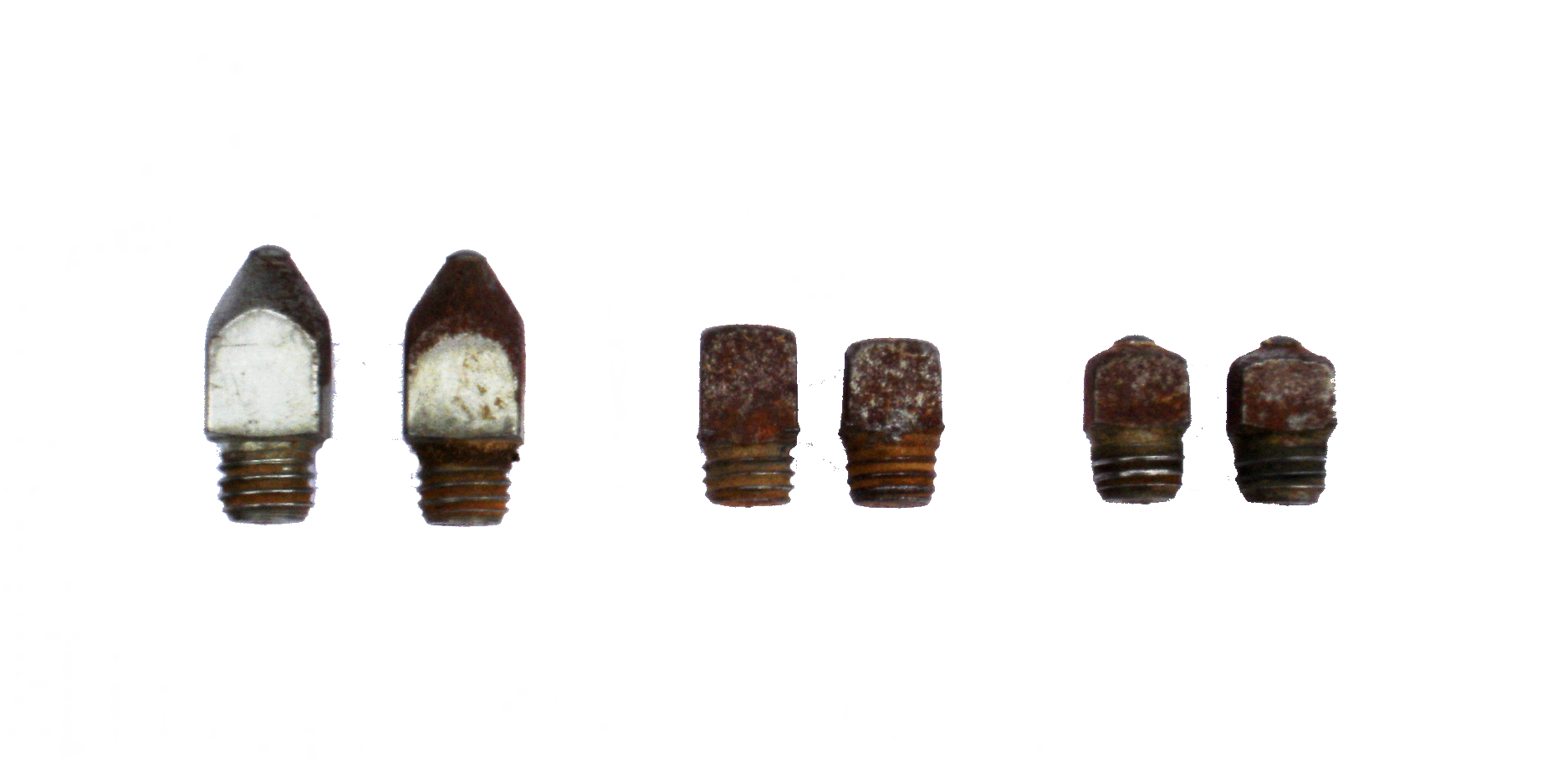
Left to right: grass studs, blocks, road studs.

Types of studs
Type	Description
Road studs	used on hard surfaces, usually 4 or 6-sided, smaller in size and blunt. Can be used front or back, on the inside of the shoe or the outside. This type of stud is fine most of the time, unless the ground is incredibly muddy or slippery.
Blocks	square in shape and best for soft, deep, muddy ground.
Bullets	best for firm ground with a layer of soft ground on top. They are large and sharp.
Grass studs	narrow and sharp to dig into hard, dry ground. They should only be used on the outside of the shoe, or just on the hind feet.
Olympic studs	used for extremely slippery ground, very long and sharp.

== Frost nails ==
Frost nails can be used in the place of studs for a few different reasons. Originally they were created to be used in icy conditions for extra traction and stability. However, they can also be used in various equine competitions for better traction on footing such as wet and slippery conditions.

The head of the nail is sharper than regular nails and is wedge shaped.

== Safety ==
Caulkins forged into the shoe which are not removable pose an increased risk of injury to handler or horse should the horse step on or kick a person, itself, or another animal. When stabled, animals wearing caulkins need extra bedding to avoid abrasion when lying down and for protection while moving about in a confined area. When working, leg protection in the form of bell boots and splint boots or exercise bandages may minimize the risk of injury.

Screw-in studs are often longer and sharper than permanent caulkins and thus are removed when the horse is not working. The hole for the stud is plugged with cotton, rubber plugs, or a stud blank so dirt does not ruin the threads of the hole. Due to risk of injury, horses are not shipped in studs or left unattended with studs screwed in.

Pointed studs, such as grass studs or pointed bullets are generally placed only on the outside of the shoe, so the horse is less likely to cut himself should his foot hit one of his legs. Road stud can be used on the inside or outside of a shoe. However, the shoe should have some stud on the inside of the shoe; without it, there will be a twisting motion on the foot, which can cause a loss of shoe, and possibly strain the legs. Most riders place smaller studs on the front feet, because the horse's hind legs are stronger and generally require more traction.

== See also ==
- Farrier
- Horse hoof

== More reading ==
- "The Farrier and Hoofcare Resource Center - Glossary". Horseshoes.com. Archived from the original on 5 July 2008.
- "Forge and Farrier".
- "Farrier Source". Archived from the original on 5 October 2016.
