= Elastic therapeutic tape =

Pseudo-medicine product; elastic cotton strip with an acrylic adhesive

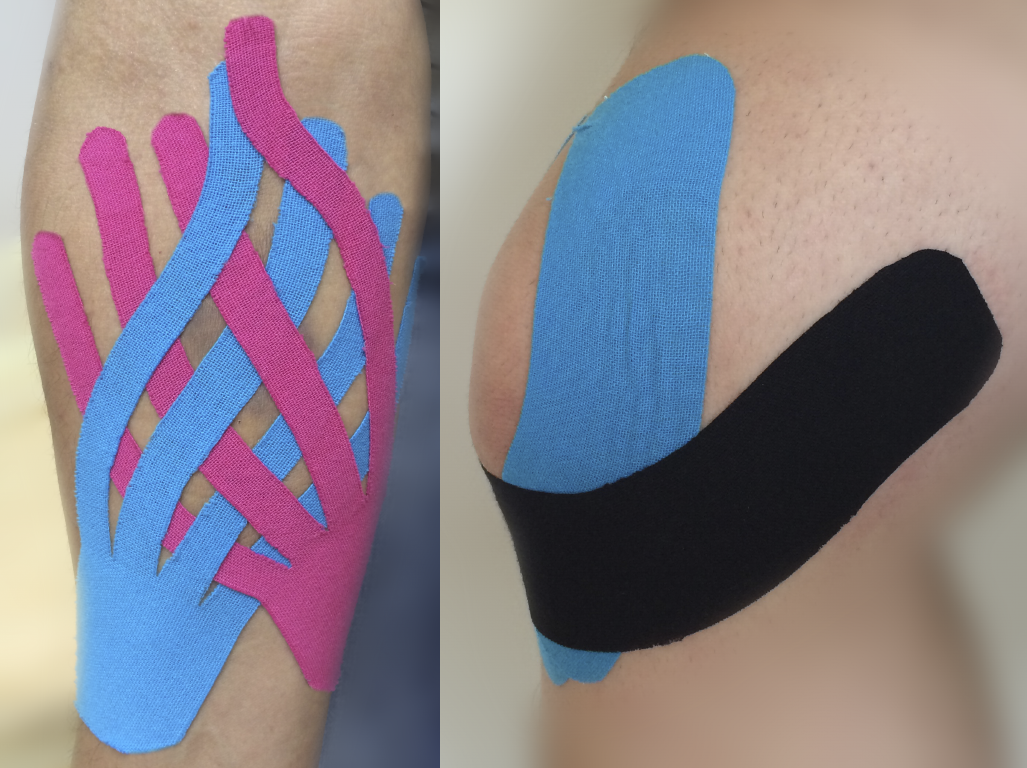
Kinesio taping

Elastic therapeutic tape, also called kinesiology tape or kinesiology therapeutic tape, Kinesio tape, k-tape, or KT is an elastic cotton strip with an acrylic adhesive that is purported to ease pain and disability from athletic injuries and a variety of other physical disorders. In individuals with chronic musculoskeletal pain, research suggests that elastic taping may help relieve pain, but not more than other treatment approaches, and no evidence indicates that it can reduce disability in chronic pain cases.

No convincing scientific evidence indicates that such products provide any demonstrable benefit in excess of a placebo, with some declaring it a pseudoscientific treatment.

== History ==
Kenzo Kase, a Japanese–American chiropractor, developed the product in the 1970s. The company he founded markets variants under the brand name "Kinesio" and takes legal action to prevent the word being used as a genericised trademark.

A surge in popularity resulted after the product was donated to Olympic athletes in the 2008 Beijing Summer Olympics and 2012 London Summer Olympics. The tapes' prominence and mass introduction to the general public have been attributed to Kerri Walsh who wore the tape on her shoulder, and who along with Misty May-Treanor dominated the 2008 beach volleyball event. In 2012, science journalist Brian Dunning speculated on why he had not seen "a single athlete, pro beach volleyball players included, wear Kinesio Tape outside of the Olympics". He believes that "sponsorship dollars may be entirely responsible for the popularity of Kinesio Tape during televised events."

== Properties ==
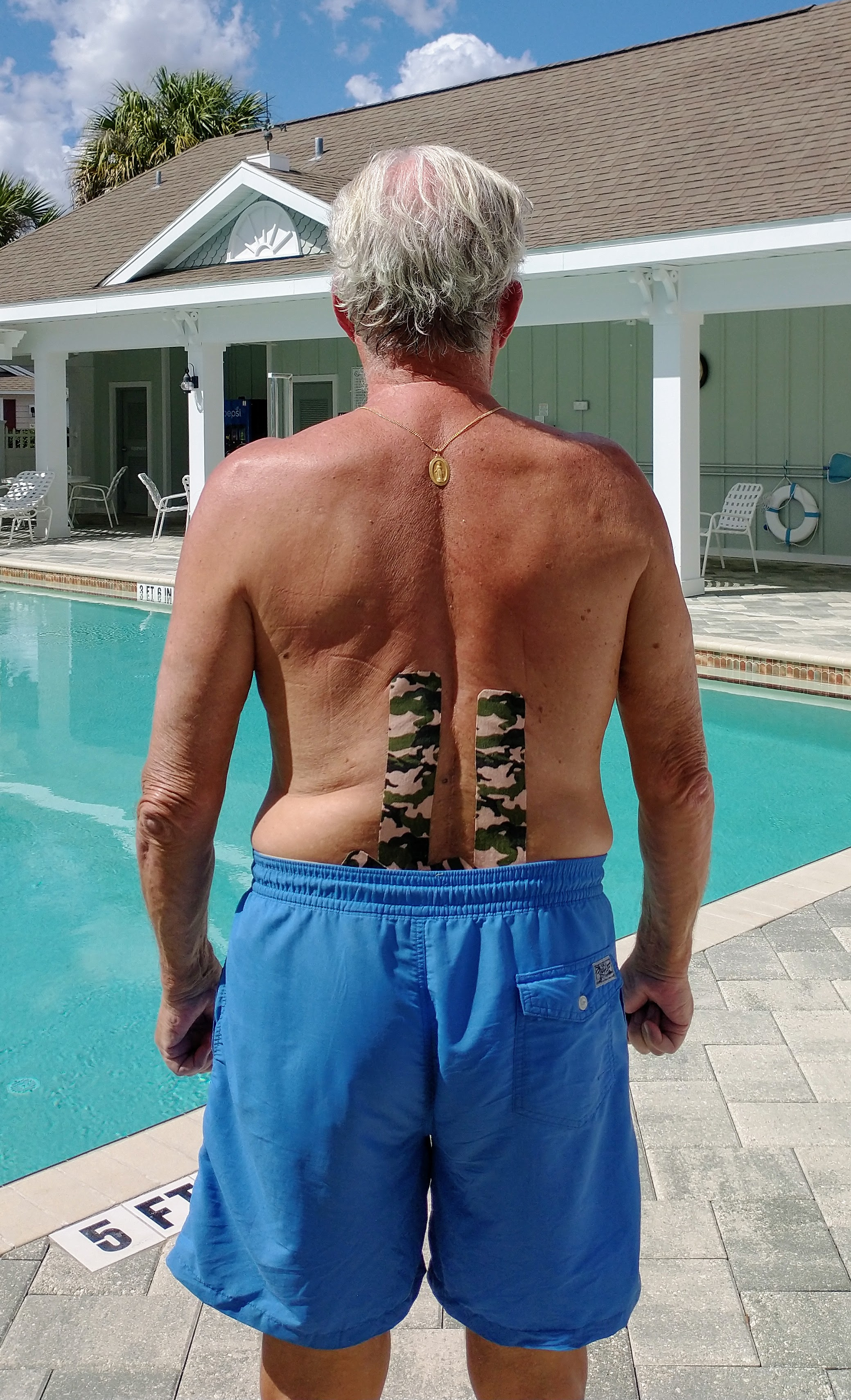
Elastic therapeutic tape used for lower back pain on an older male

The product is a type of thin, elastic cotton tape that can stretch up to 140% of its original length. As a result, if the tape is applied stretched greater than its normal length, it will "recoil" after being applied and therefore create a pulling force on the skin. This elastic property allows much greater range of motion compared to traditional white athletic tape and can also be left on for long periods before reapplication.

Designed to mimic human skin, with roughly the same thickness and elastic properties, the tape can be stretched 30%–40% longitudinally. It is a latex-free material with acrylic adhesive, which is heat-activated. The cotton fibers allow for evaporation and quicker drying leading to longer wear time, up to 4 days. How the tape is claimed to affect the body is dependent on the location and how it is applied; the stretch direction, the shape, and the location all supposedly play a role in the tape's hypothetical function.

== Effectiveness ==
Manufacturers have made a wide variety of claims, including that it provides physical support for muscles, tendons, ligaments, and joints. KT Health's web site at one point claimed the tape "lifts the skin, decompressing the layers of fascia, allowing for greater movement of lymphatic fluid which transports white blood cells throughout the body and removes waste products, cellular debris, and bacteria". This increase in the interstitial space purportedly reduces pressure on the body's nociceptors, which detect pain, and stimulates mechanoreceptors, to improve overall joint proprioception. Critics say these claims are not supported by evidence.

In the 2012 article "Scientists sceptical as athletes get all taped up", Reuters reported that "In a review of all the scientific research so far, published in the Sports Medicine journal in February, researchers found 'little quality evidence to support the use of Kinesio tape over other types of elastic taping in the management or prevention of sports injuries". Some researchers claim that what athletes are experiencing is just a placebo effect.

In July 2012, Steven Novella writing in Science-Based Medicine in the article "Olympic Pseudoscience", examined the use of KT in the larger context of "sports-related pseudoscience". Novella says "The world of sports competition is rife with pseudoscience, false claims, dubious products, superstitions, and magical charms." Novella concluded that "Consumers should be very skeptical of claims made for products marketed as athletic performance enhancing."

In August 2012, science journalist Brian Dunning reports in "Kinesio Tape: The Evidence" that positive studies of the tape are the result of people being deceived by a "stage magician's trick" – which he describes in detail – that is used to fool subjects into thinking strength or flexibility is being affected, when they are not. He reports that kinesio tape is claimed to be good for a plethora of issues including "pain management, injury treatment, injury prevention, enhanced performance, increased range of motion, and just about anything else an athlete might want." He concludes: "It sounds like a miracle – one simple product that does everything you can imagine. In short, a textbook snake oil product."

A 2012 meta analysis found that the efficacy of elastic therapeutic tape in pain relief was trivial, because no reviewed study found clinically important results. The tape "may have a small beneficial role in improving strength, range of motion in certain injured cohorts, and force sense error compared with other elastic tapes, but further studies are needed to confirm these findings". The article concluded: "KT had some substantial effects on muscle activity, but it was unclear whether these changes were beneficial or harmful. In conclusion, there was little quality evidence to support the use of KT over other types of elastic taping in the management or prevention of sports injuries."

A 2014 meta analysis looked at methodological quality of studies, along with overall population effect, and suggested that studies of lower methodological quality are more likely to report beneficial effects of elastic therapeutic taping, thus indicating the perceived effect of using kinesio taping is not real. It also suggested that applying elastic therapeutic tape, "to facilitate muscular contraction has no, or only negligible, effects on muscle strength".

A 2015 meta analysis found that the taping provided more pain relief than no treatment at all, but was not better than other treatment approaches in patients with chronic musculoskeletal pain. The same meta analysis did not find any significant changes in disability as a result of taping.

In March 2018, Science-Based Medicine again examined KT in response to its public use at the 2018 Winter Olympics in the article A Miscellany of Medical Malarkey Episode 3: The Revengening. The article reports that:

The claims made by manufacturers and promoters of the tape are highly implausible, particularly those involving increased muscle strength, improved blood flow to an injured areas [sic], and better lymphatic drainage to reduce swelling. No evidence supports these claims. Pain reduction and injury prevention are also frequently-cited benefits that similarly lack evidence, at least none showing an effect specific to kinesio tape... There is no evidence of a specific benefit related to kinesio tape itself, or to any kind of expert application of it.

In November 2018, Science-Based Medicine described a study published the same month in the journal BMC Sports Science, Medicine and Rehabilitation which examines the effectiveness of different colors of kinesiology tape, as well as reexamining general effectiveness of kinesiology tape against a placebo. Describing the conclusions of the study, they write:

Nothing mattered. Tape color didn't matter. Color preference didn't matter. "Proper" placement of KT with tension didn't matter. No effect on performance, strength, or function was found in any experimental round compared to the control round for any of the subjects.

A 2023 systematic review included nine randomised controlled trials in their meta-analysis, and concluded that KT can significantly reduce pain intensity between baseline and immediately post-intervention and between baseline and the short-term follow-up period. However, no significant differences existed between KT's ability to relieve other symptoms of CNLBP—disability, trunk flexion range of motion (ROM), change in status, fear of movement, isometric endurance of the trunk muscles, or extension—when compared to either sham taping or KT as an adjunct to physical therapy.

== Deceptive marketing lawsuit ==
In 2017, KT Health settled a class-action lawsuit in Massachusetts, resolving claims of unjust enrichment and untrue and misleading marketing. It agreed to pay $1.75 million (equivalent to $2.2 million in 2024‍) to refund half the purchase price of the tape, representing the premium paid above traditional athletic tape. The brand also agreed to drop claims that the tape "will keep you pain-free", "prevents injury", or provides "24-hour pain relief", and add the disclaimer "not clinically proven for all injuries".

== See also ==
- Buddy wrapping – Bandaging a damaged finger or toe to a healthy one
- Elastic bandage – Pressure-creating dressing
- Self-adhering bandage – Bandage that sticks to itself but not other surfaces
- Kinesiology – Study of human body movement
