= Broken toe =

- Other names: Bedroom fracture, nightstand fracture, nightwalker fracture
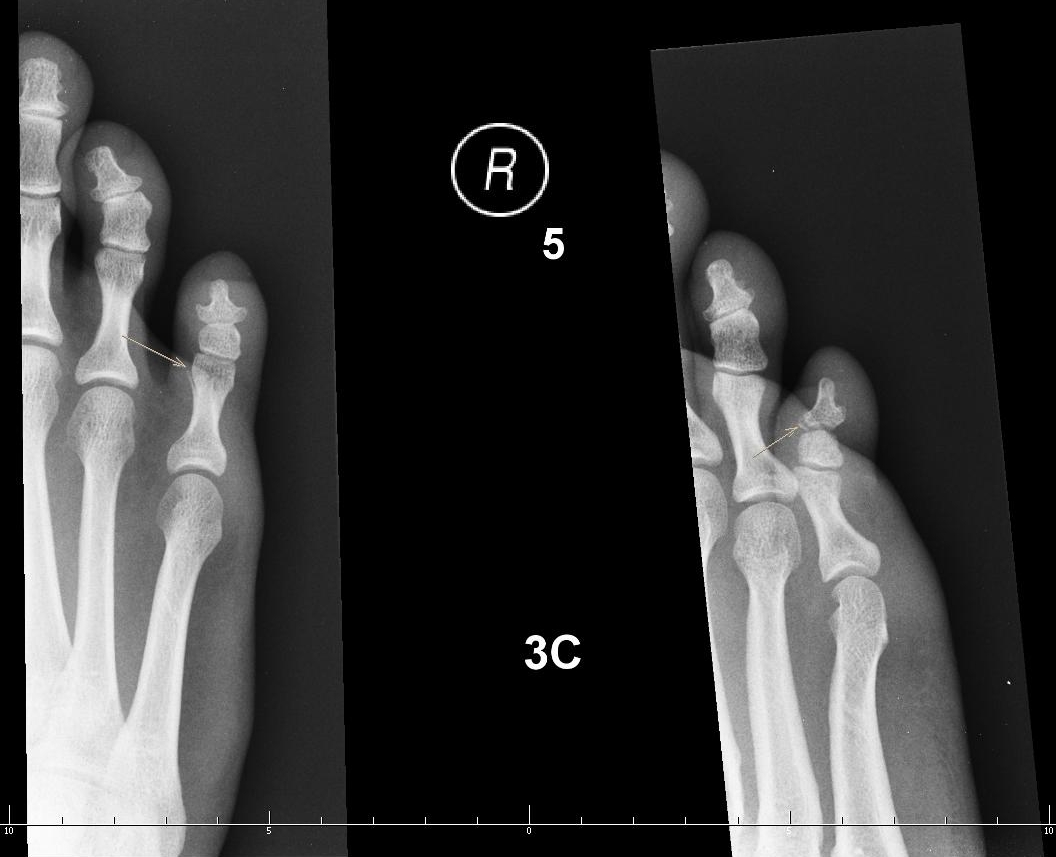
- X-rays of fractures of the proximal (left) and distal (right) phalanges in the little toe.
- Specialty: Emergency medicine
- Symptoms: Pain, tenderness, bruising, swelling, displacement of the bones.
- Complications: Compromised blood circulation; malunion, long-term pain, degenerative joint disease, infection
- Usual onset: Sudden
- Causes: Stubbing or crushing over-extending a toe joint, stress fracture
- Diagnostic method: Visualisation, X-rays
- Treatment: For pain and swelling, rest, icing, elevation and pain medication; wearing wide, flat, comfortable, stiff-soled shoes; for smaller toes, buddy wrapping (taping the toe to the nearest toe, with some absorbent padding in-between); rarely, a cast or surgery
- Medication: Over-the-counter painkillers
- Prognosis: 4 to 8 weeks for full healing; pain lessens within days
- Frequency: Common, 8–9% of all fractures

A broken toe is a type of bone fracture. Symptoms include pain when the toe is touched near the break point, or compressed along its length (as if gently stubbing the toe). There may be bruising, swelling, stiffness, or displacement of the broken bone ends from their normal position.

Toes usually break because they have been stubbed or crushed. Crushing breaks are often caused by dropping something on the toe. More rarely, over-extending a toe joint can break off a portion of the bone, and stress fractures are possible, especially just after a sudden increase in activity. Diagnosis can be based on symptoms and X-rays.

Fractures of the smaller toes are usually treated with rest, buddy taping (taping the toe to the nearest toe, with some absorbent padding in-between), and wearing comfortable, wide-toed, flat, stiff-soled shoes. For pain and swelling of all toes, rest, icing, elevation and pain medication are used. Pain usually decreases significantly within a week, but the toe may take 4–6 weeks to heal fully. As activity is slowly increased to normal levels, the toe may be a bit sore and stiff. If the bone heals crooked, it may be relocated with or without surgery. Broken toes can usually be cared for at home, unless the break is in the big toe, there is an open wound, or the broken ends of the bone are displaced. In high-force crushing and shearing injuries, especially those with open wounds, blood circulation (tested by capillary refill) can be impaired, which needs urgent professional treatment. More serious broken toes may need to be re-aligned or put in a cast; surgery is rarely needed. These cases may take longer (six to eight weeks) to heal fully.

Broken toes are one of the most common types of fracture seen in doctor's offices, and make up just under 10% of fractures in some offices.

== Definition and classification ==

Toe bones or phalanges of the foot. Note the big toe has no middle phalanx.
People vary; sometimes the smallest toe also has none (not shown).

Distal phalanges of the foot
Middle phalanges of the foot
Proximal phalanges of the foot

Big toe fractures are treated differently from fractures of the lesser toes. Toe fractures may be articular (affecting the joint surfaces at the ends of the bone) or diaphyseal (between the ends). They can be displaced, non-displaced, closed or open.

The AO Foundation/Orthopaedic Trauma Association (AO/OTA) classification generates numeric codes for describing broken toes. They run 88[meaning a fracture of the phalanges].[number-code of toe, with the big toe=1 and the little toe=5].[number-code of phalanx, counting 1-3 outwards from the foot].[number-code of location on the bone, with 1 being the inner end, 3 the outer, and 2 in-between]. So, for instance, 88.1.2.1 means a fracture to the big toe's innermost bone, at the proximal end. A letter can be added to describe the fracture pattern.

== Signs and symptoms ==
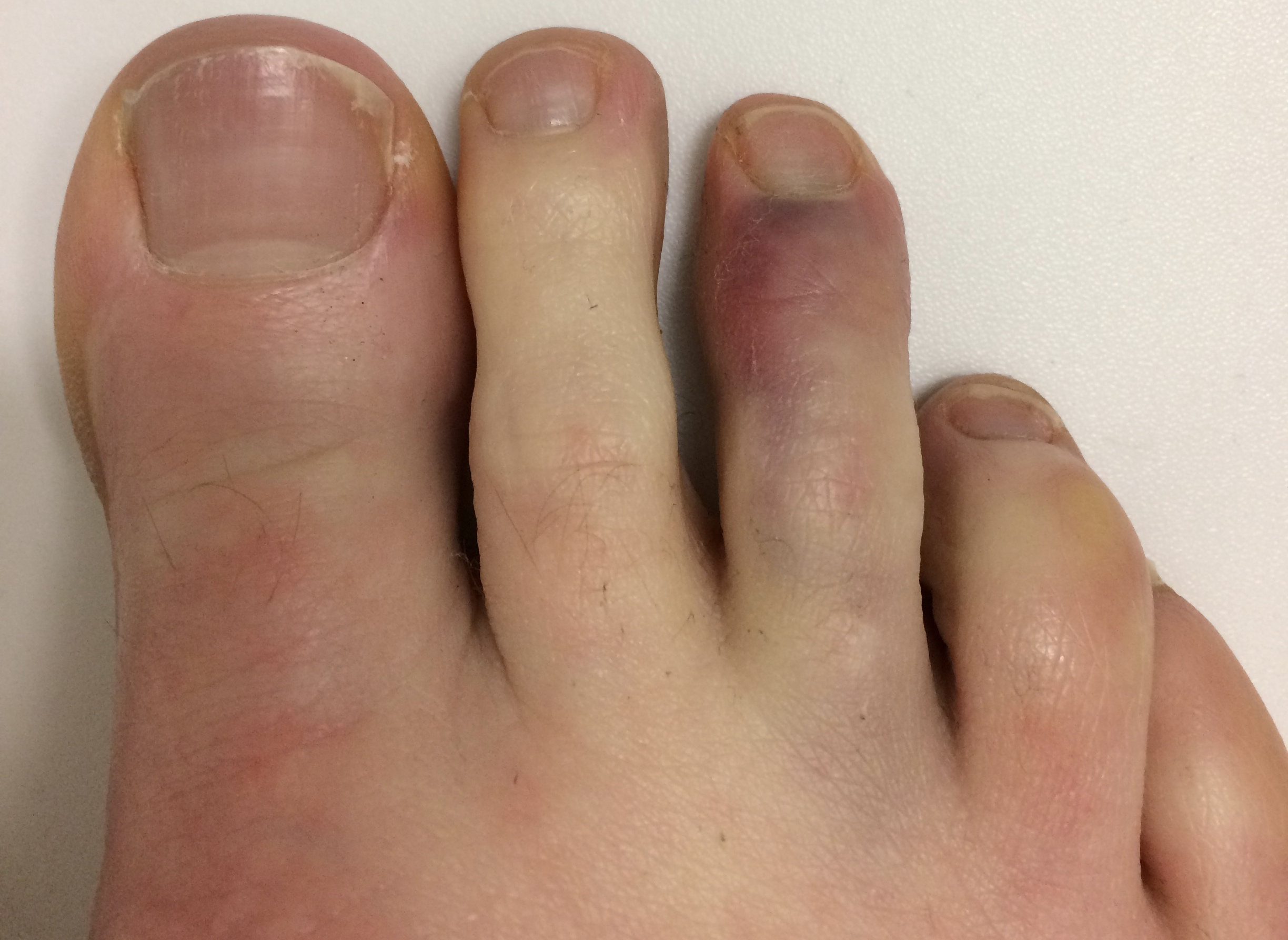
Broken toe with bruising and swelling

Symptoms include pain when the site of the fracture is gently pressed, or when the toe is gently compressed along its length or moved. There may be bruising or swelling; sometimes there is a crackling sound. There may be displacement of the bones; the alignment of the nail bed is compared to the same toe on the uninjured foot to check if the toe has rotated (see spiral fracture).

Injuries to the nail bed and neurovascular bundles may be present.

=== Complications ===
Diabetes can make foot injuries more serious, and those with diabetes are advised to have broken toes seen by a doctor. Peripheral arterial disease can also be a complication.

Malunion, healing with the bones out-of-place, can cause long-term pain and significant disability. Malunion of joint surfaces may cause degenerative joint disease. Malunions may be corrected with or without surgery.

When a toe is broken by crushing, there is often also a subungual hematoma (bleeding/bruising of the nail bed, under the toenail). If there is enough blood to cause pain, it can be drained to relieve the pain and avoid (temporarily) losing the nail. Draining is usually done if the injury is less than 24 hours old. Preserving the nail helps splint the broken toe. Contaminated wounds are more serious; the wound should be kept clean.

Broken toes with open wounds, especially if there is necrosis, can lead to osteomyelitis. Joint problems are more likely in cases of involvement/possible displacement of the joint surface and, in children, involvement of the growth plate. Degenerative arthritis of the distal (outer) big toe joint can occur as a complication of fractures, especially fractures to the proximal (inner) end and diaphysis (midsection) of the proximal bone. If the proximal phalanx of the big toe is broken, hallux valgus (bunion) is a frequent complication.

In high-force crushing and shearing injuries, especially those with open wounds, blood circulation can be impaired.

== Causes ==
Toes usually break because they have been stubbed or crushed. Crushing breaks are often caused by dropping something on the toe. More rarely, over-extending a toe joint can break off a portion of the bone, and stress fractures are possible, especially just after a sudden increase in activity.

=== Risk factors ===
Kicking the ground during sports may result in "turf toe" with an associated broken toe.

Getting up suddenly at night, particularly when barefoot, and having a forceful impact with furniture may lead to a broken toe, also called a "bedroom fracture" "nightstand fracture" or "nightwalker fracture". Although generally associated with the fifth toe and big toe, it can occur in any toe. In such a fracture, the hard blow to the tip of the distal phalanx typically results in a transverse or oblique fracture in the proximal phalanx (base of toe), but can occur in any phalanx.

An open wound toe fracture may result from an injury from a lawn mower.

Although broken toes in horse riders are uncommon, riders are most likely to get broken toes when standing next to their horse.

== Mechanism ==
Because the big toe is more important for weight-bearing, balance, walking, and running, breaks to the big toe are more likely to be problematic. If the big toe is stubbed and breaks, it usually breaks the distal (outermost) bone. A crushing injury can break both big-toe bones.

If the joint was bent too far (i.e. either hyperextended or hyperflexed) then spiral fractures and avulsion fractures are common. Spiral fractures with displacement make the toe rotate and shorten. With transverse fractures (i.e. across the toe), the toe may bend abnormally.

== Diagnosis ==
Broken toes are diagnosed by physically examining the toe, gently pressing on it, asking how it feels, and comparing it to the toe on the opposite foot (see signs and symptoms, above). Blood circulation may be tested by capillary refill.

It may be unclear whether the toe has a bone fracture or just a soft-tissue injury (such as bruising, sprains and tendon injuries). In these cases, it doesn't matter, because the treatment is usually the same for both types of injury. There is no need to figure out whether the toe is actually broken. Follow-up X-rays also generally have no effect on treatment, and are unnecessary.

X-rays are usually only taken if there are complications, or the toe is not healing as expected. If X-rays are taken, the neighbouring toes and joints are also imaged. If there is diffuse pain and tenderness across the foot, it may be necessary to X-ray the whole foot. For displaced fractures, follow-up X-rays may be taken 3-6 weeks after injury.

If a dislocated toe (a joint dislocation) is suspected, an X-ray may needed.

In people with multiple traumas, foot trauma is often neglected.

== Treatment ==
It may not be clear whether the toe is broken or just bruised. In such cases the treatment is usually the same in either case.

=== Removing rings ===
Any rings on the toes are removed immediately, before the toe starts to swell. Pulling rings off forcefully may worsen the swelling. Relaxation, elevation, icing, lubrication (e.g. soapy water or oil), and rotating the ring as if unscrewing it may help. If these methods don't work, it may be possible to remove the ring by temporarily wrapping the toe with a slick thread (something like dental floss), passing the inner end of the thread under the ring and then unwrapping it, pushing the ring ahead of the unwrapping thread. Failing that, the ring may need to be cut off by a doctor.

=== Reduction ===
If the fracture displaces the bones from their proper position (which it often doesn't), it needs to be reduced. Reduction puts the toe back into alignment, with all parts of the bones in the correct anatomical position. This is usually done by pulling gently along the length of the toe, then gently pulling the toe back into place. If there are multiple displaced bone fragments, shuffling them back into the correct positions may be more complicated. The fracture will usually stay in the correct position once re-aligned; if not, it needs more specialized treatment to hold the parts in place so that it heals straight.

=== Stabilization and protection ===
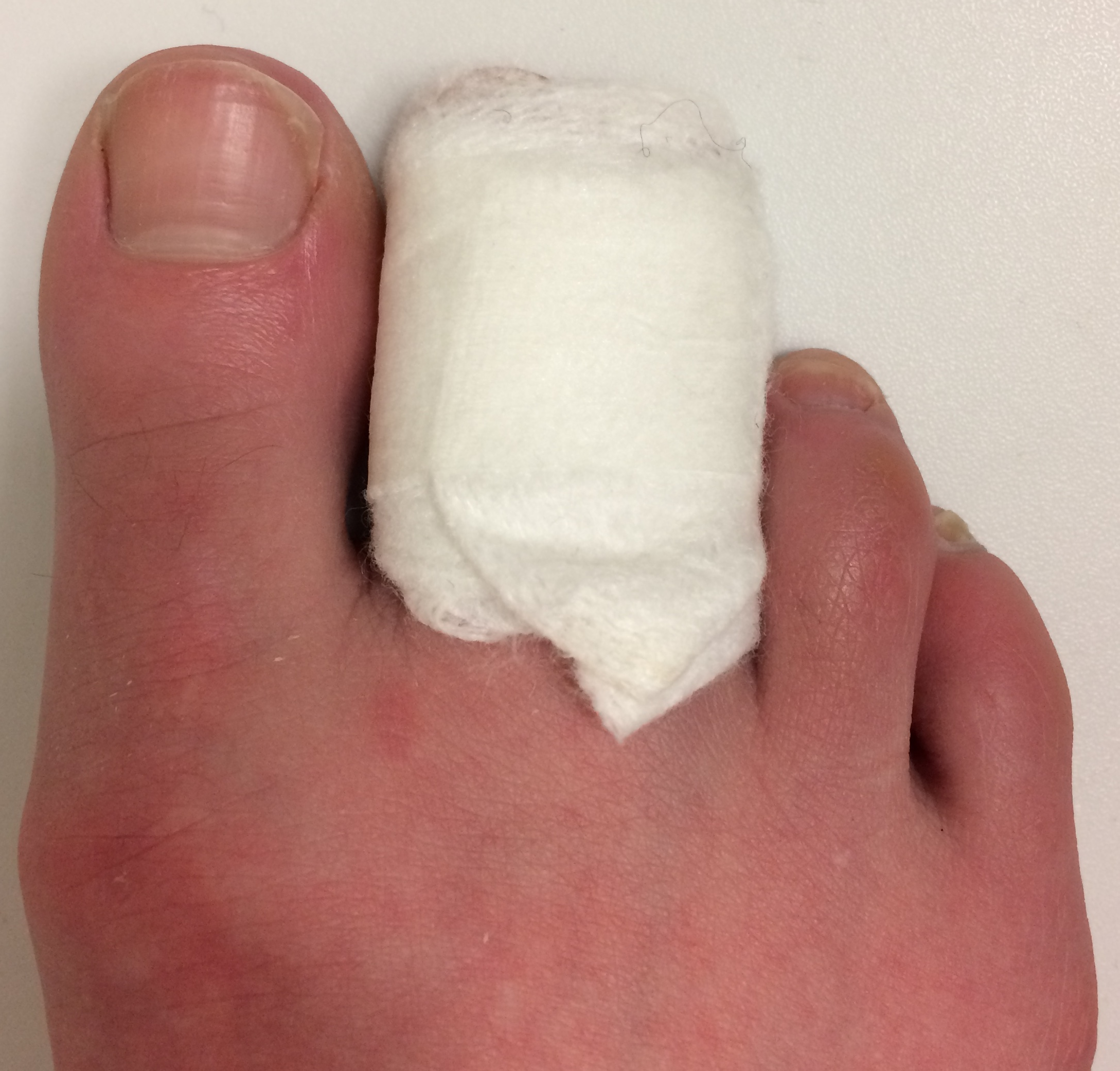

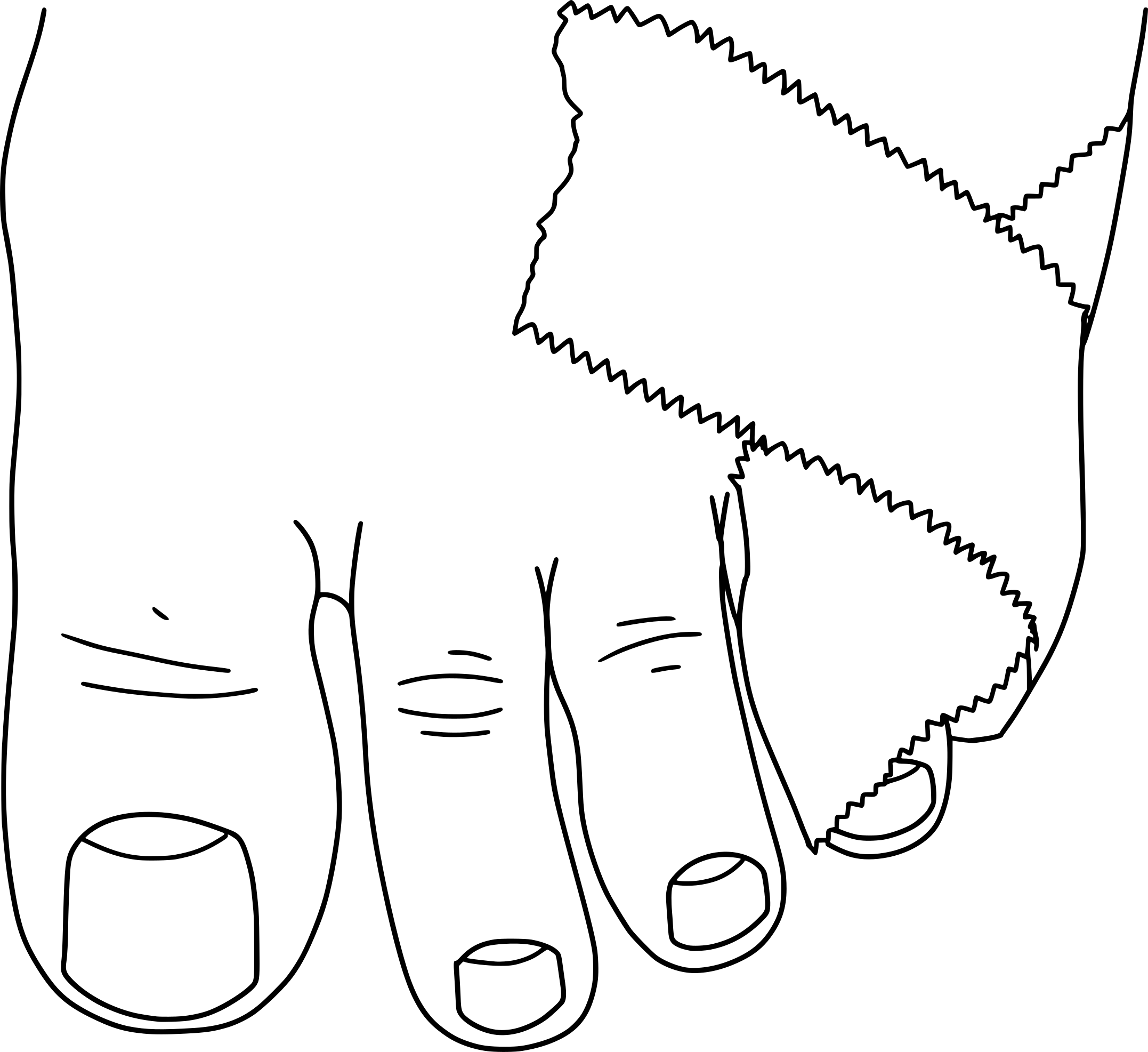
Buddy-taping toes, using the most suitable adjacent toe to splint the broken toe.

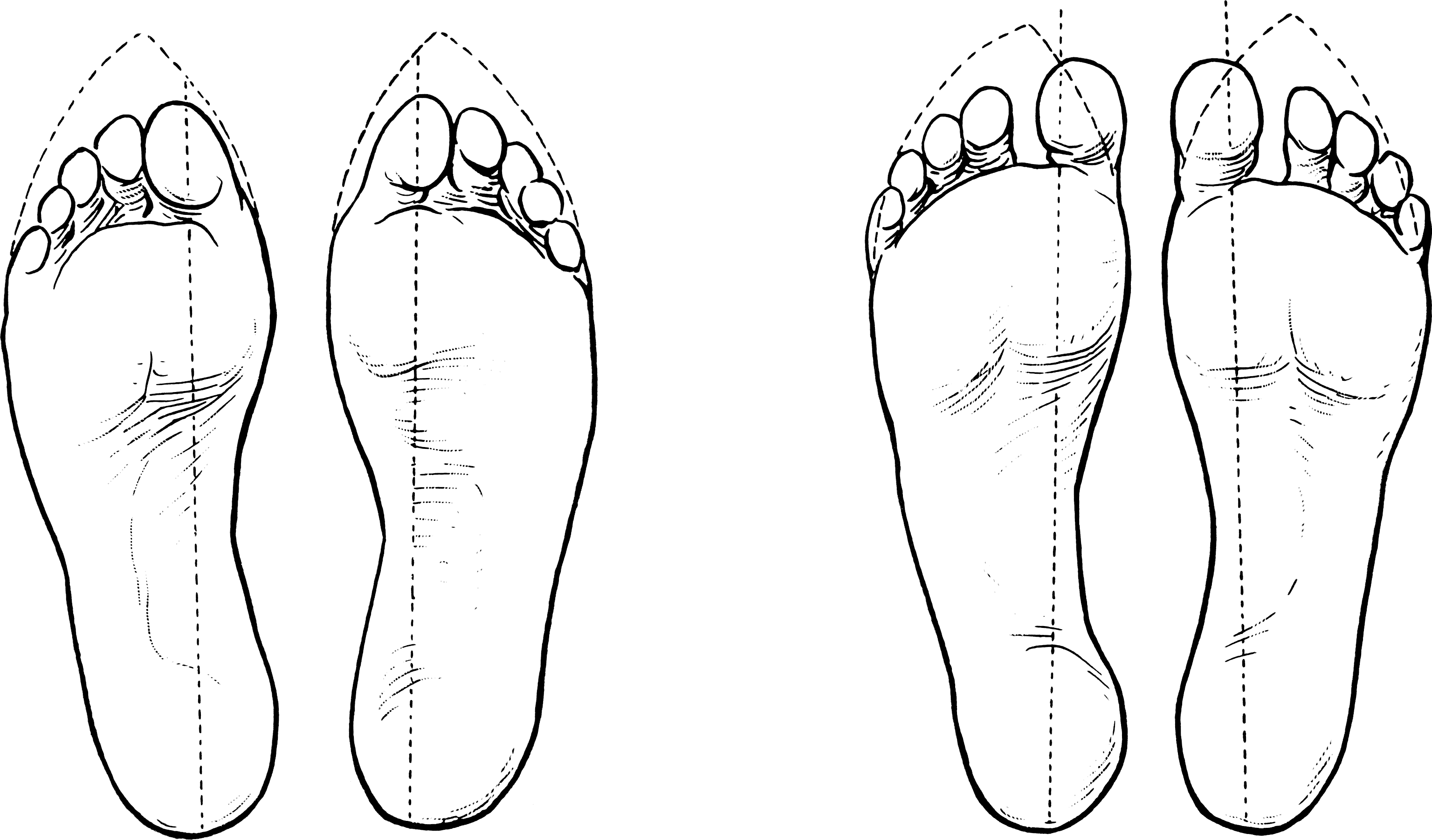
Wider shoes allow the toes to lie straight. If the toes overhang when standing on the removed insole (right), then they will be cramped inside the shoe (left).

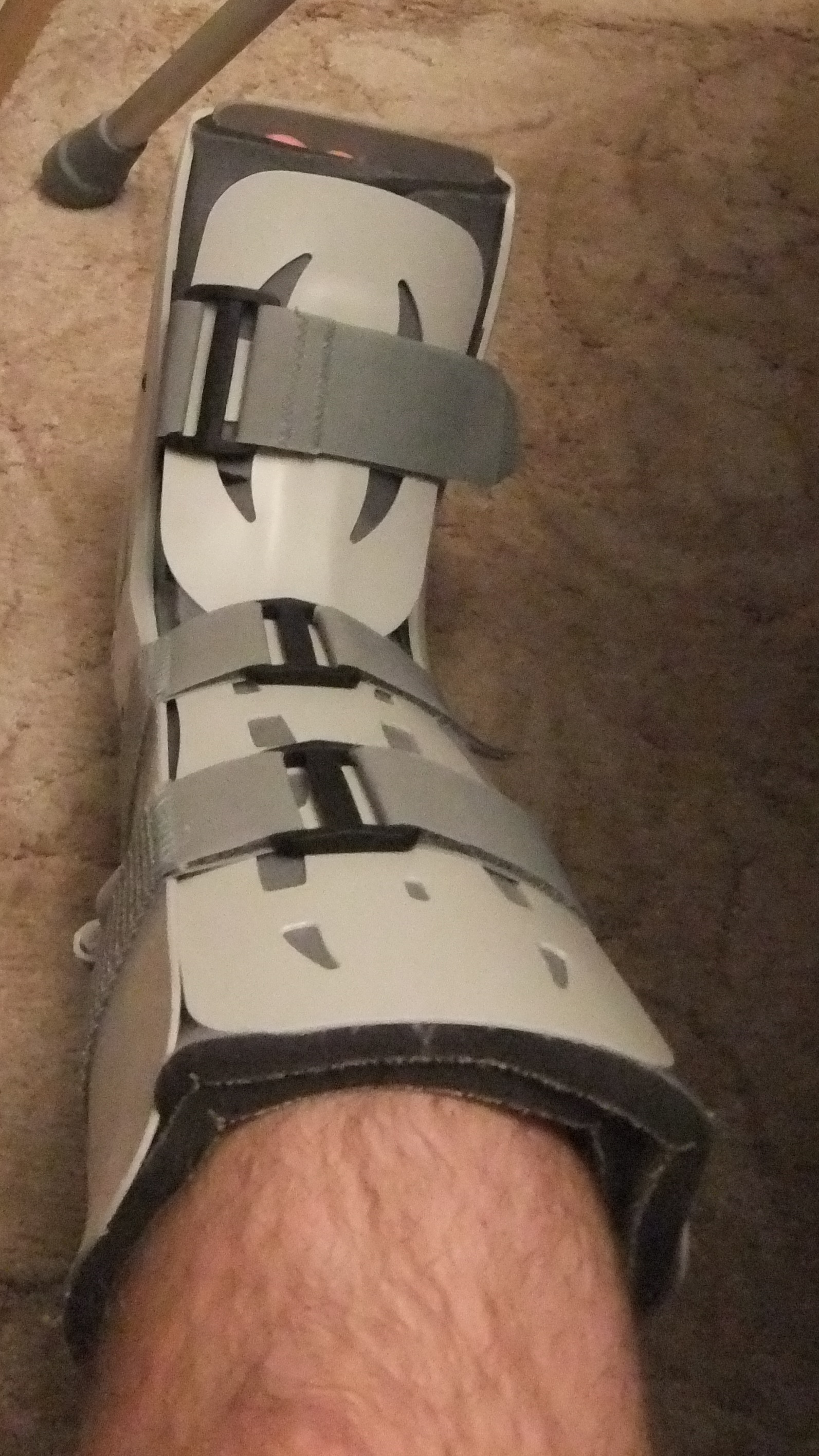
A walking boot

Fractures of the smaller toes are commonly treated by buddy taping (see image). Padding is used between the toes to keep the space dry and the toes aligned comfortably. If the toes are less comfortable when buddy-taped, the buddy tape should be removed. Taping is not recommended for those with diabetes or peripheral arterial disease.

It is also helpful for shoes to be stiff-soled (to protect the toe from bending), low at the heel (even a <2cm heel can increase pressure on the forefoot by over 20%), and wide. Most shoes, especially women's shoes, have a toe box which is more than a centimeter too tight; the width of the foot should be measured standing, with weight on it. Comfortable shoes are recommended; tight, pointy shoes are undesirable. If the top of the shoe is making the broken toe more painful, it is should be changed for something that won't, like open-toe sandals or old sneakers with the toe cut away.

Somewhat more serious fractures which affect a joint, but with less than 2mm displacement and less than 25% of the area of the joint surface on the broken part, are generally also be treated with buddy taping and suitable shoes; the evidence on this treatment is not extensive.

Fractures with displacement at the break, including rotation, can often be reduced (re-aligned) by a family doctor. Some broken toes may need to be put in casts, especially if the fracture is unstable (it won't stay reduced on its own). If more than 25% of the area of the joint surface was on the broken-loose part, or the break had to be reduced, follow-up X-rays are done 7–10 days afterwards.

Fractures of the big toe are treated with a short-leg orthopedic walking boot, or a short-leg walking cast with a sole that protrudes beyond the big toe. These are worn for 2–3 weeks. Buddy taping and a rigid sole are then used for 3–4 weeks, if symptoms allow. At four weeks, range-of-motion exercises can start. If the joint was involved or the break had to be reduced, follow-up X-rays are done a week afterwards.

=== Pain and swelling ===
Activities which cause pain should be avoided, and resumed slowly as the toe heals.

To reduce pain and swelling, rest, ice, elevation and over-the-counter pain medication are used. The toe is chilled with ice 20 minutes of every hour for the first waking day, and 2-3 times a day afterwards. Ice is not put directly on the skin.

=== Surgical ===
Surgery is not needed for most broken toes, but may involve fastening bits of toe bone together with wires, screws, or screwed plates. Such procedures are within the scope of orthopaedic surgery.

== Prognosis ==
Complete healing may take four to six weeks, and complex cases may take up to eight weeks. Some athletes may need longer. Long-term disability is rare. (see complications section).

== Epidemiology ==
Approximately 8 to 9% of all broken bones are of a toe. Studies have varied as to whether broken big toes are more or less common than broken lesser toes. In a UK study involving nearly 6000 fractures seen in hospital, 3.6% were broken toes. Fractures of big toes make up about a fifth or third of all toe fractures, and 5.5% of all foot and ankle fractures in major US trauma hospitals. Toe fractures are the most common foot fractures. About 20% of broken toes involve open wounds.

== Other animals ==
Buddy strapping can be used for toe fractures in big birds. Sometimes a ball bandage can be used, where the bird curls its toes over it. Due to pneumatic bones in birds, washing an open toe fracture may be harmful. Broken toes in grebes can be splinted but if dislocated, often require amputation. A toe fracture in an elephant may go unnoticed. Knocked-up toes in racing greyhounds may be mistaken for a toe fracture.

== See also ==
- Foot fractures
- Subungual hematoma (black nail)
- Interphalangeal joints of the foot (toe joints)
- Phalanges (bones of fingers and toes)
- Broken finger
