= Buddy wrapping =

Bandaging a damaged finger or toe to a healthy one

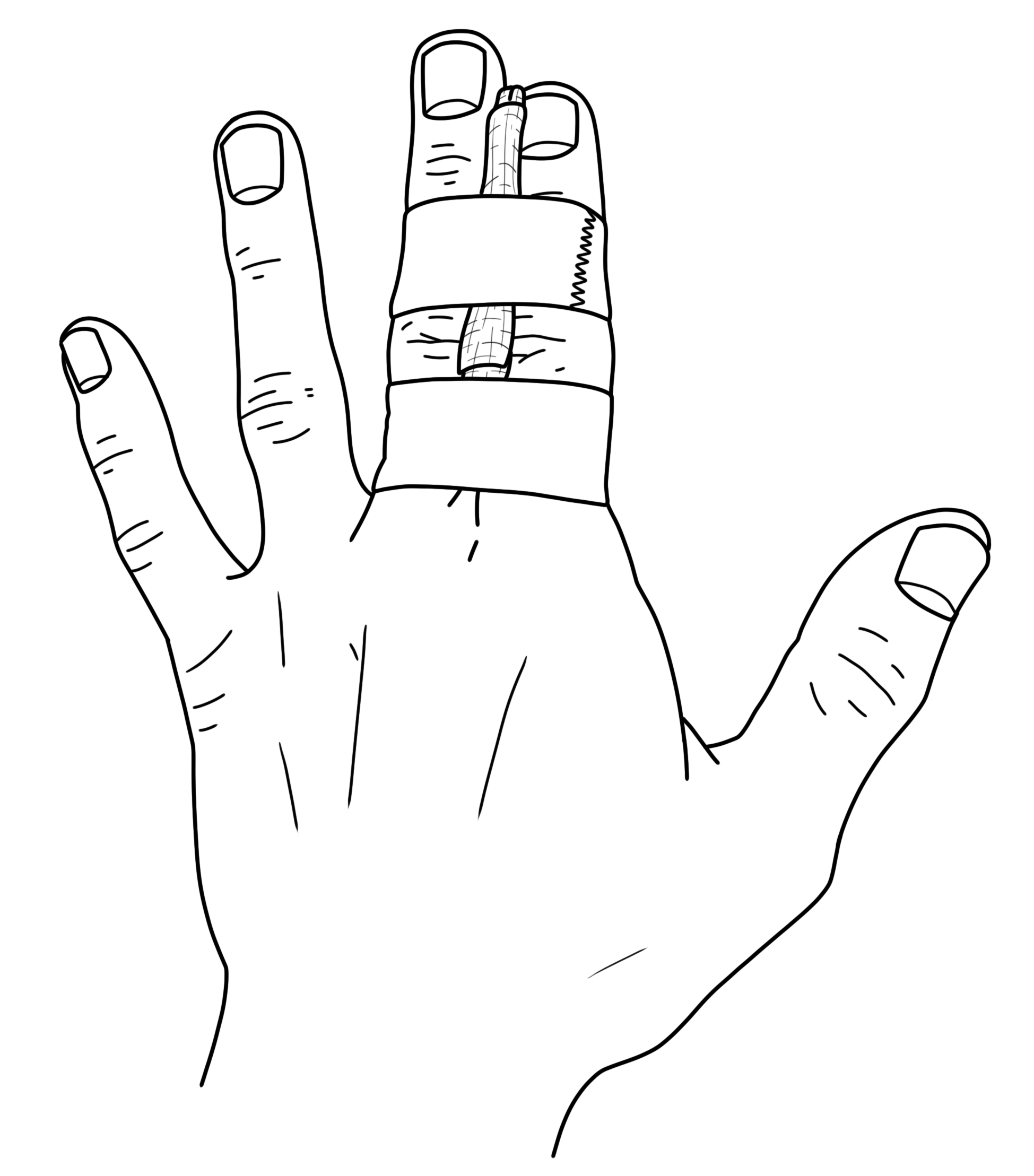
- Buddy taping

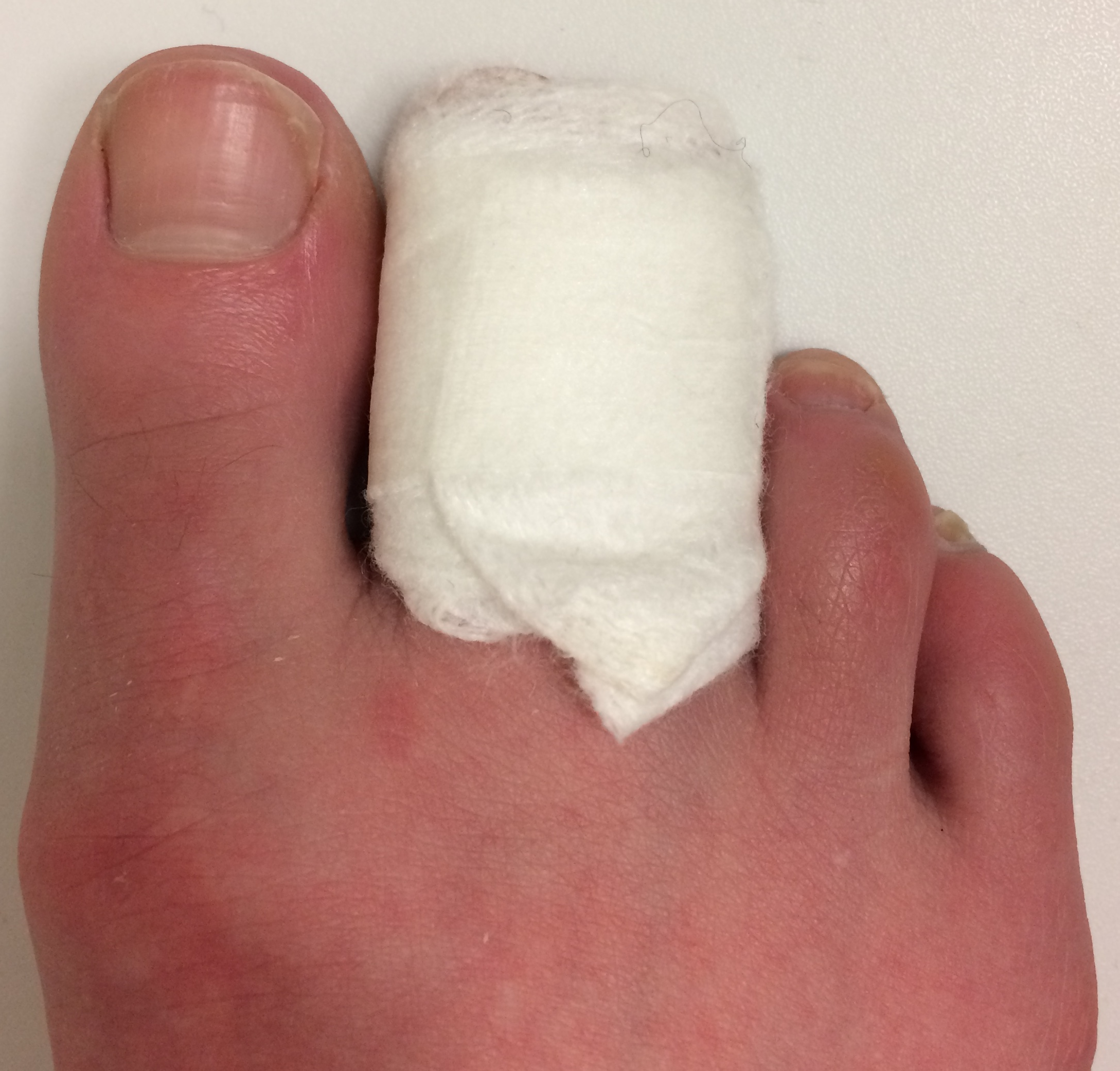

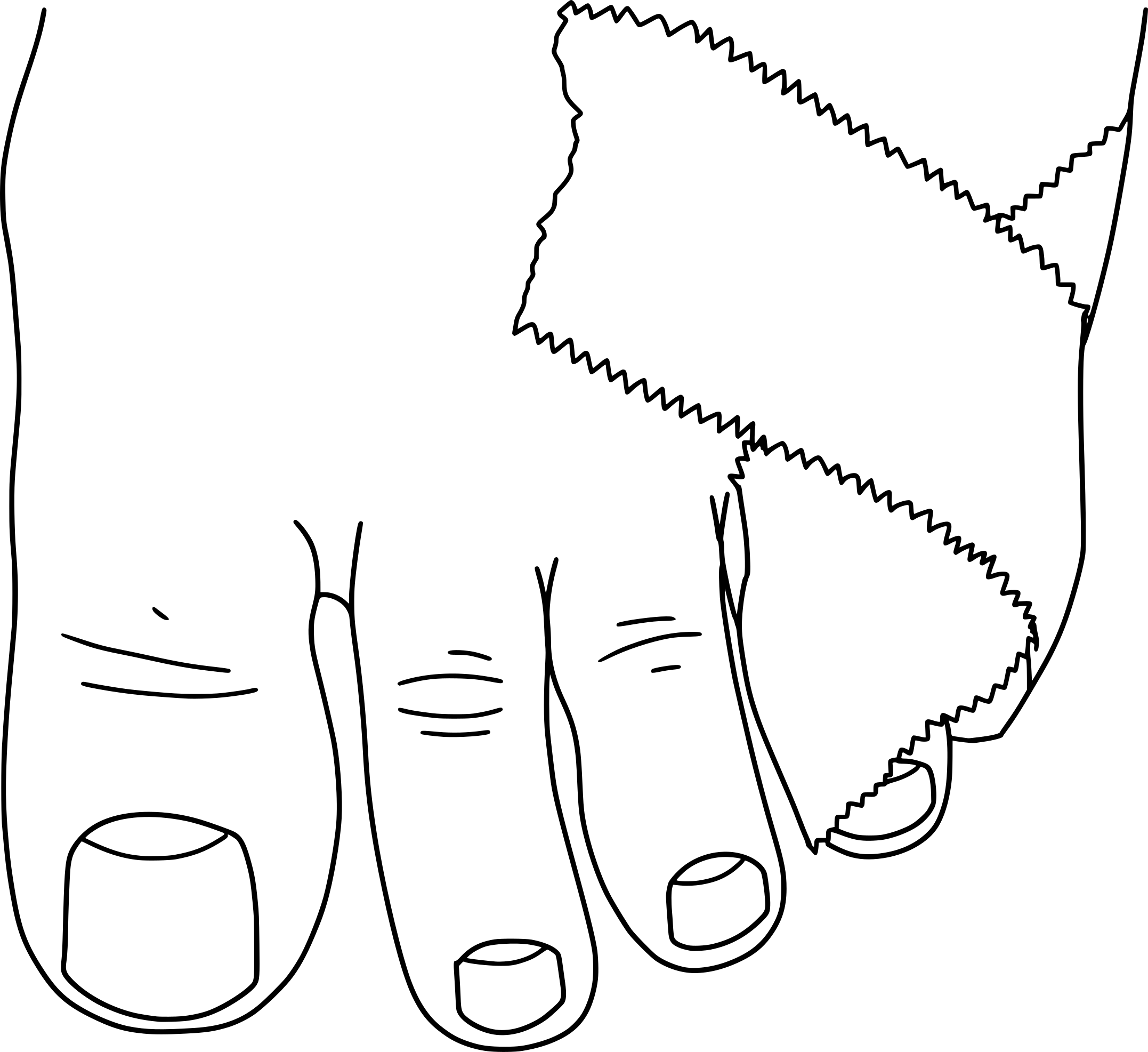
Buddy-taping toes, using the most suitable adjacent toe to splint the broken toe

Buddy wrapping, also called neighbour strapping or buddy taping, is the act of bandaging a damaged or particularly a fractured finger or toe together with a healthy, uninjured one. The bandage or medical tape is usually stiff, not allowing the digits to move; the healthy digit acts as a splint, keeping the damaged one in a natural position for healing. Rest plays a major role in the healing process. Buddy wrapping may also be used for sprains, dislocations, and other injuries.

This treatment may be performed by a physician or other medical professional in a hospital, orthopedic clinic, or other medical facility. Buddy wrapping may also be used when medical help is not immediately available, for example in the wilderness. Buddy wrapping can be a temporary solution or it can be used as a treatment all by itself.

A layer of absorbent cotton or gauze is placed between the digits to prevent the breakdown of the skin with resultant ulcers and/or infection. The bandage is applied loosely, in several non-encircling layers. This avoids cutting off the blood flow to the digit that a too-tight wrap can precipitate. If the damaged part is only partly fractured, e.g., a greenstick fracture, the buddy wrapping method may also be used.

Fractures of the smaller toes are commonly treated by buddy taping. Padding is used between the toes to keep the space dry and the toes aligned comfortably. If the toes are less comfortable when buddy-taped, the buddy tape should be removed.

== See also ==
- Elastic therapeutic tape
- Elastic bandage
- Self-adhering bandage
- Athletic taping
