= Elastic bandage =

Pressure-creating dressing

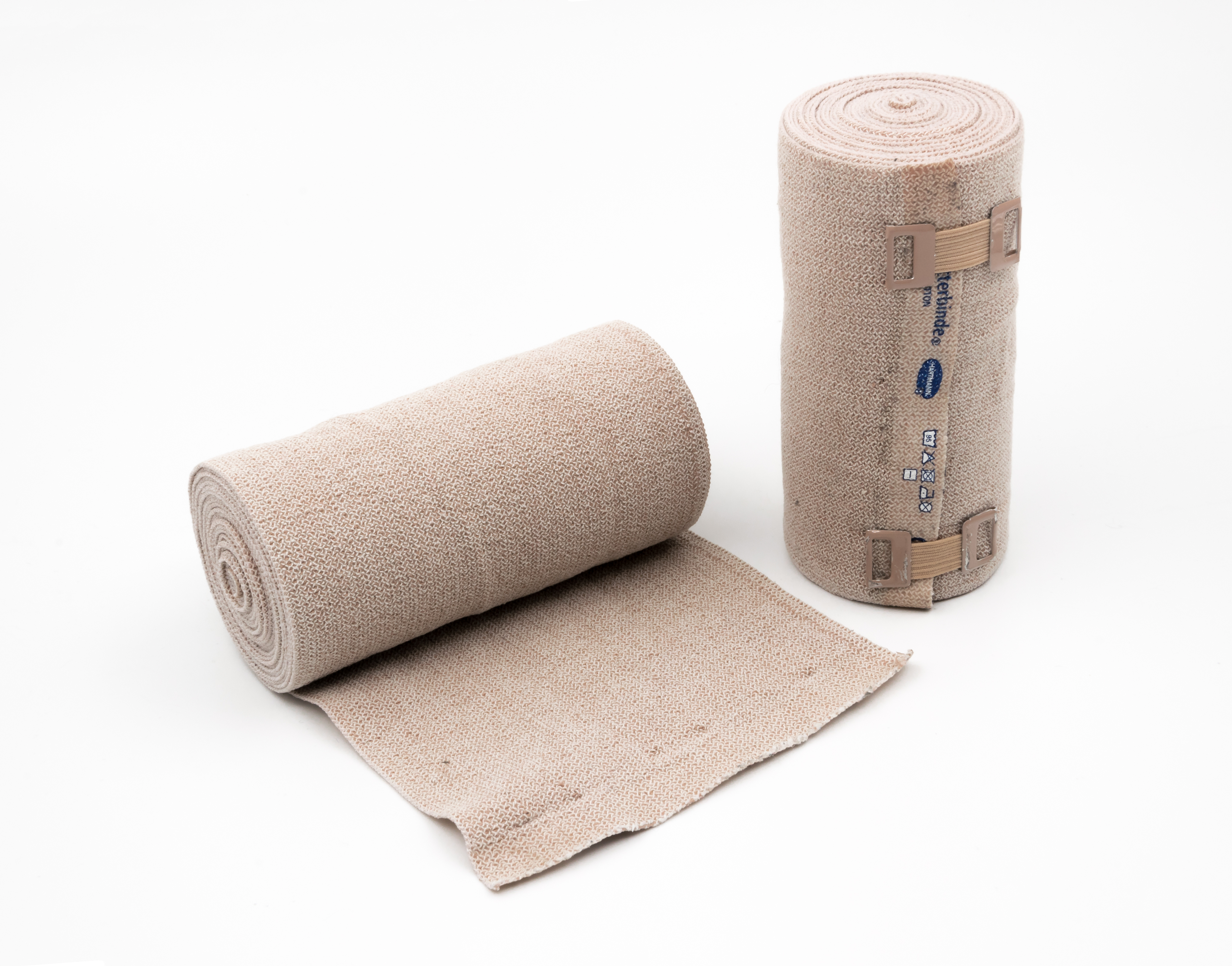
Elastic bandage

An elastic bandage (commonly referred to by the 3M brand ACE bandage or compression wrap) is a stretchable wrap used to exert localized pressure. In first aid and clinical settings, it is primarily used to manage muscle sprains and strains by applying uniform compression to reduce local blood flow and restrict swelling.

Elastic bandages are also used to secure temporary splints following bone fractures. The wrap holds the splint in place and protects the affected limb. This is a technique is common for fractures prone to swelling, where a rigid cast could cause pressure complications or result in a loose fit later. These types of splints are usually removed after swelling has decreased and is replaced with a fiberglass or plaster cast.

Due to the risk of latex allergies among users, the original composition of elastic bandages has changed. While some bandages are still manufactured with latex, many woven and knitted elastic bandages provide adequate compression without the use of natural rubber or latex. The modern elastic bandage is constructed from cotton, polyester and latex-free elastic yarns. By varying the ratio of cotton, polyester, and the elastic yarns within a bandage, manufacturers are able to offer various grades of compression and durability in their wraps. Often aluminum or stretchable clips are used to fasten the bandage in place once it has been wrapped around the injury. Some elastic bandages even use Velcro closures to secure and stabilize the wrap in place.

Aside from use in sports medicine and by orthopedists, elastic bandages are popular in the treatment of lymphedema and other venous conditions. However, some compression wraps are inadequate for the treatment of lymphedema or chronic venous insufficiency. They provide a high resting compression and low active compression. A more appropriate use for compression in treating lymphedema or other edema conditions would be TG shapes, tensoshapes, compression socks or compression wraps for acute conditions or exacerbation. Physical therapists and occupational therapists have special training and certifications to apply appropriate compression wraps for edema and lymphedema. Elastic bandages can also be used for rehabilitating injured animals through veterinary medicine. Their use in mud wraps produces temporary weight loss by inducing sweating, which is regained after restoring a healthy level of hydration by consuming water.

Elastic bandages should not be confused with compression therapy devices designed for the purpose of venous edema management or lymphedema management. Such devices are specifically designed to deliver graduated compression from the ankle to the knee, to assist with venous return.

== See also ==
- Elastic therapeutic tape
- Cohesive bandage
- Buddy wrapping
- Athletic taping
