= Cohesive bandage =

Bandage that sticks to itself but not other surfaces

- Acronym: Coban
- Synonyms: Self-adhering bandage
- [edit on Wikidata]

A self-adhering bandage or cohesive bandage (coban) is a type of bandage or wrap that coheres to itself but does not adhere well to other surfaces. It is generally suitable for people with adhesive allergies and for applying to delicate areas.

"Coban" by 3M is commonly used as a wrap on limbs because it will stick to itself and not loosen. Due to its elastic qualities, coban is often used as a compression bandage. A variety of generic forms exist.

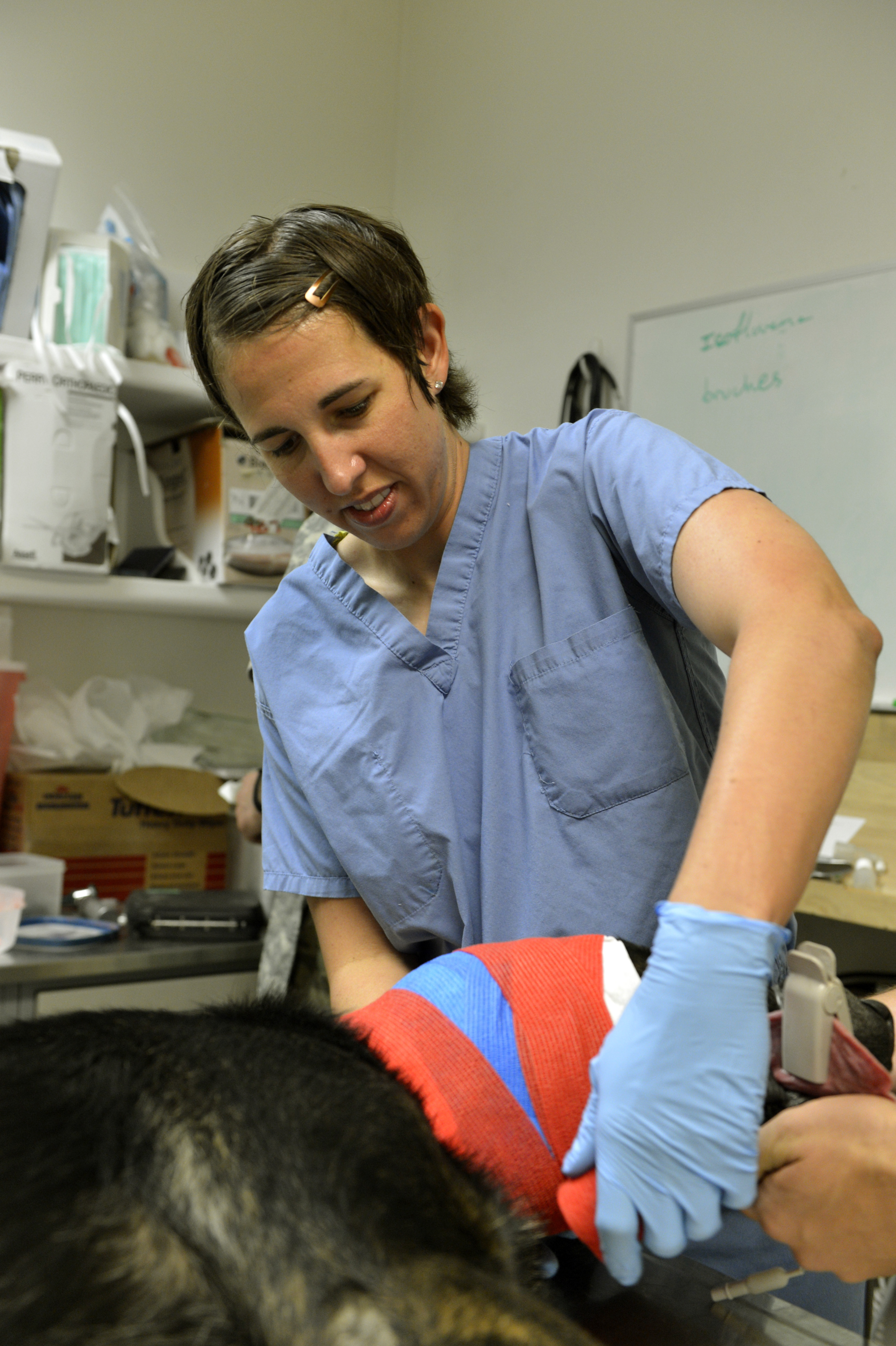
A surgeon wrapping a dog's head

It is used both on humans and animals. For animal use, it is marketed under a variety of trade names such as "Vetrap" by 3M. It is commonly used on horses and other animals because it will not stick to hair so it is easily removed.

== Uses ==
Cohesive bandages are often used to secure other care items like as a cotton ball or gauze pad to an area such as to apply compression to a vein after a blood draw. The compression can also attempt to reduce swelling of extremities. Coban can also gently constrain movement, reminding the patient not to move certain ways. It can also help support weak or sprained joints. Another application is for areas a pre-cut adhesive bandage might struggle to fit such as ears. Self-adhesive bandages are sometimes used to apply light tension for foreskin restoration through tissue expansion. Some cohesive bandages claim better breathability than adhesive bandages, which may or may not be desired.

== See also ==
- Elastic therapeutic tape
- Elastic bandage
- Buddy wrapping
- Athletic taping
- Horse leg protection
