= Horse leg protection =

List of types of leg wraps

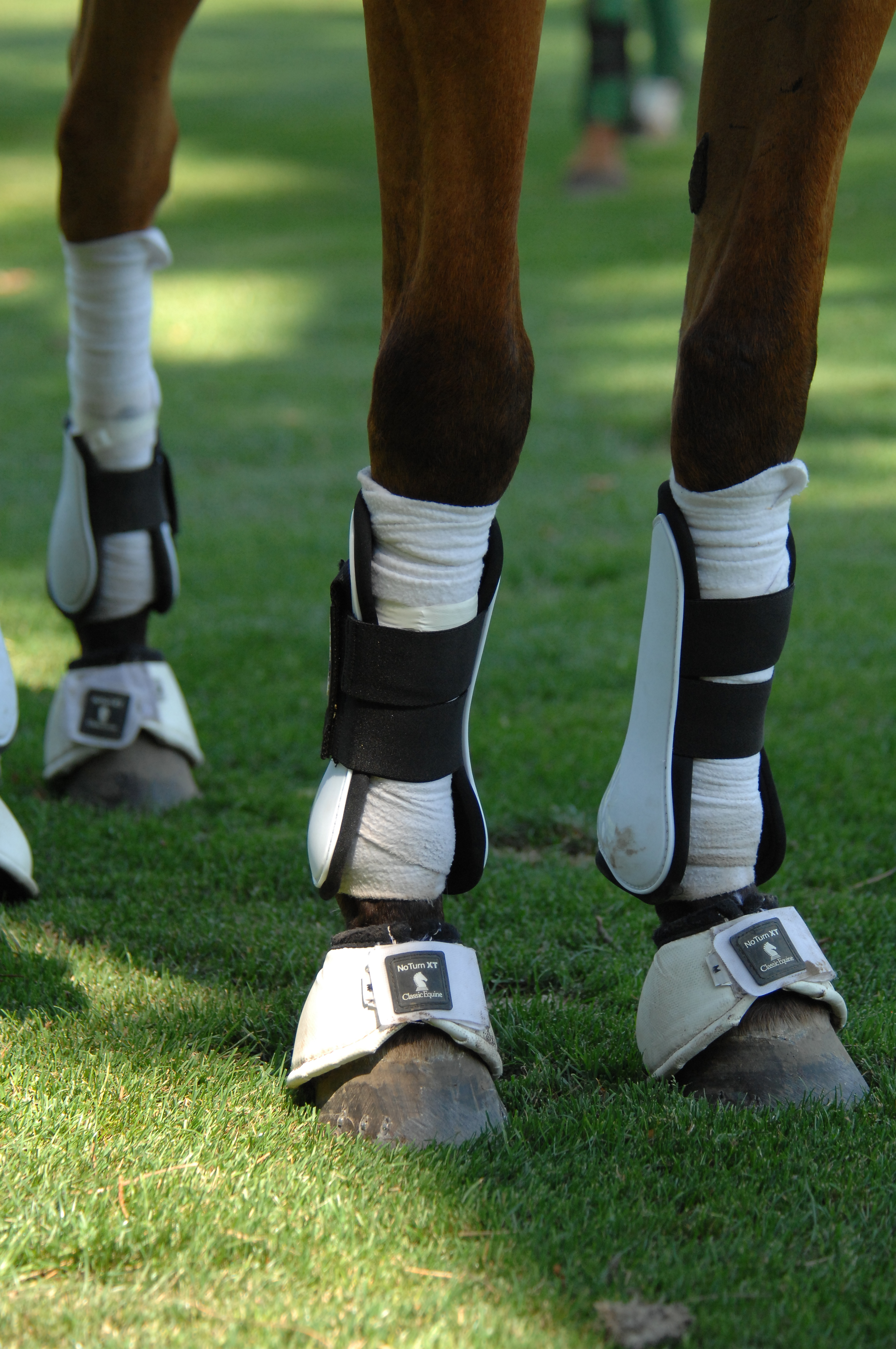
Horse wearing wraps and boots

Leg wraps and boots are used for the protection of the lower legs of horses during training, shipping, and exercise, as well as for therapeutic and medical purposes to provide support for injuries or coverage of wounds. Boots are manufactured as a single unit to be applied to the leg with straps, and wraps are long elastic bandage material wrapped around and around the legs.

== Boots ==
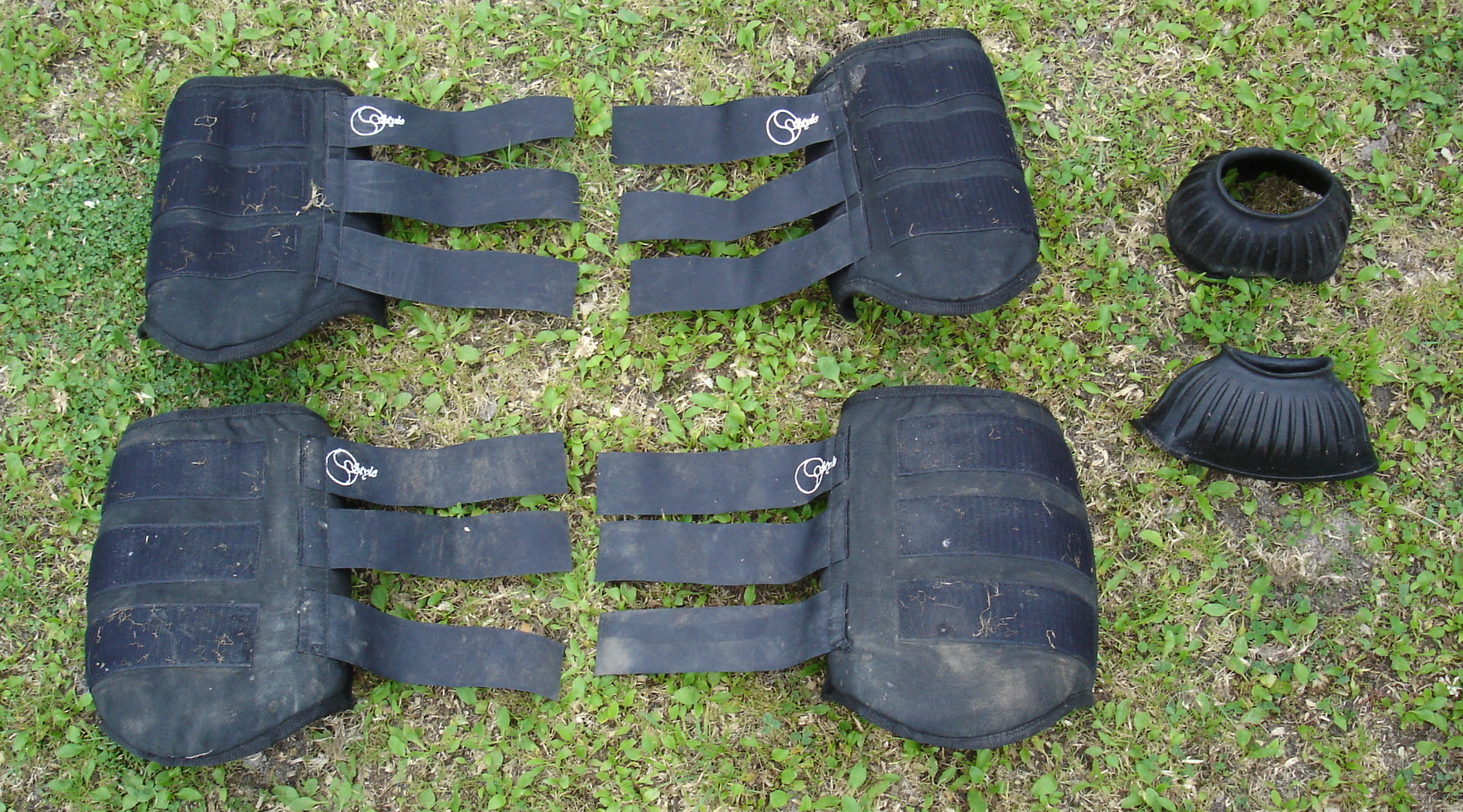
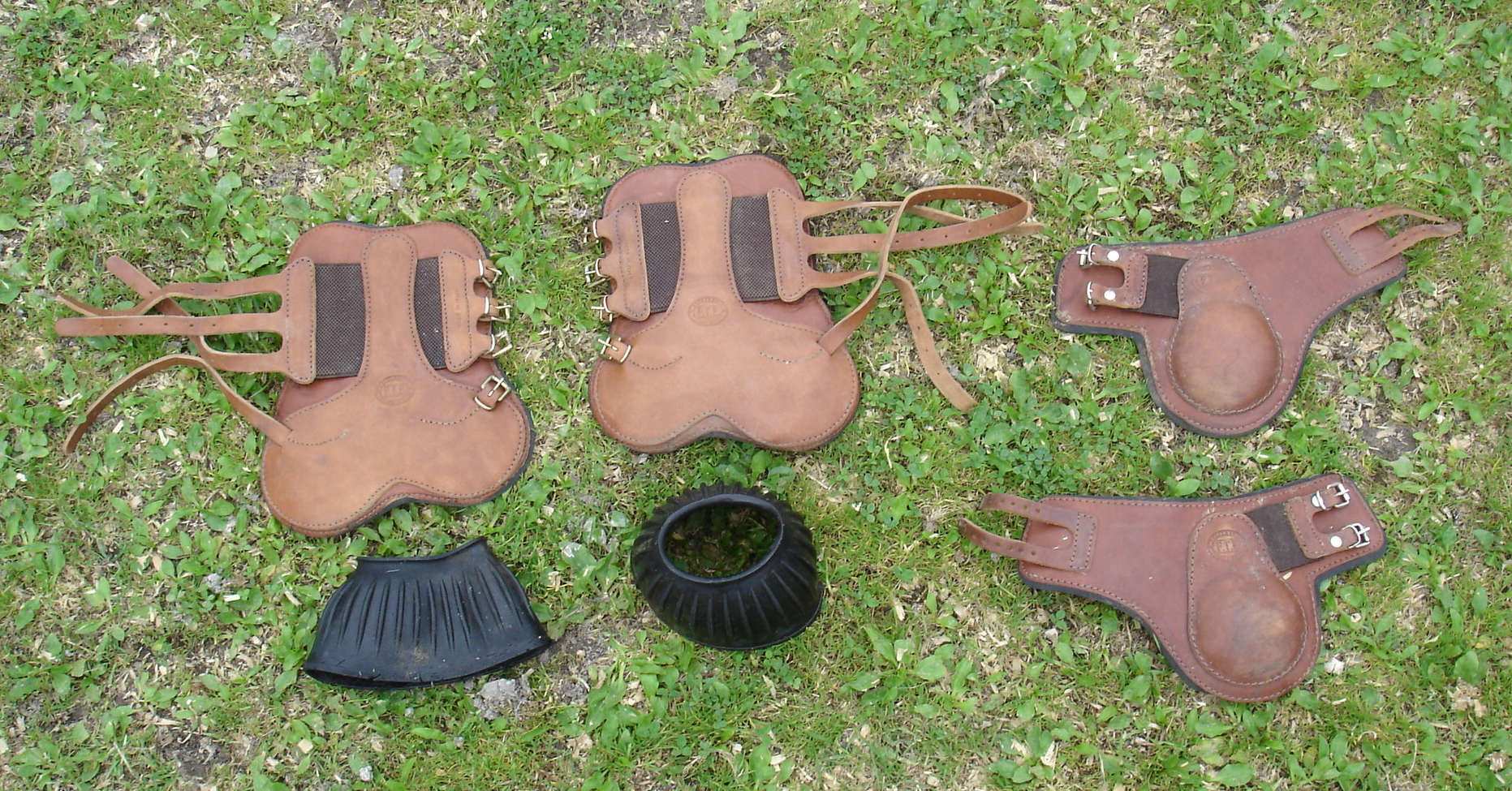
Neoprene set of boots with hook-and-loop straps (top); leather set with buckles (bottom)

Modern boots are either made of synthetic materials such as neoprene and rubber with nylon straps and hook-and-loop closures, but may also be made from leather with buckled straps. Boots should be correctly fitted to each horse—if they are too tight they can cause discomfort and pressure injuries, and if too loose they may become dislodged or come off. Incorrectly fitted boots will be uncomfortable, can cause rubbing and soreness, and can impede the horse's movement. Boots should not be applied when wet or dirty because they can cause irritation and create sores. Boots intended to be used during exercise should be removed after work, and not worn for long periods.

=== Bell boots ===
Bell boots or overreach boots are bell-shaped boots which encircle the horse's pastern and drape over the hoof. They help protect the back of the pastern and the heel bulbs from being injured from strikes by the toe of the hind hoof (overreaching), striking the rear of the hoof bottom (forging), and stepping on the edge of the shoe with the adjacent hoof potentially pulling it loose.

Bell boots are usually made of rubber. They may be of closed design which need to be stretched and slipped over the hoof, or an open design with hook-and-loop or buckled straps. Open bell boots are easier to apply, but closed bell boots are more secure as they have no chance of slipping off. When applying closed bell boots, it is easiest to turn them inside out then slip them over the toe of the hoof. It may also help to place them in warm water so they will expand before trying to put them on. A correctly sized bell boot should just touch the ground behind the bulbs of the heel while the horse is standing. The top of the bell boot should be just loose enough to fit a finger or two between the boot and the horse's pastern. Most horses do not mind wearing bell boots and suffer no adverse effects when they are used properly. However, even a correctly fitted bell boot may chafe and cause discomfort to a horse if the material very stiff or if the horse has especially sensitive skin.

=== Brushing boots ===
Brushing boots are used to protect the horses lower limbs from striking one another (known as brushing) during exercise. Brushing boots are commonly made of neoprene or breathable mesh with multiple straps (usually hook-and-loop fastening) to secure the boot around the leg. Brushing boots usually feature a reinforced strike pad on the inside of the leg. This is made of a tougher material, often a flexible plastic, compared to the rest of the boot.

=== Tendon/Fetlock boots ===
Tendon boots are used to support a horse's front legs from tendon injuries. They provide support to the tendons in the rear of the horses leg, usually being made of a rigid plastic or reinforced leather. Tendon boots are commonly open-fronted, to allow the horse to feel any poles knocked down when Show jumping as well as to allow airflow to reach the legs, preventing overheating. Tendon boots fasten on the outside of the leg with multiple straps, and either hook-and-loop or pin fastenings. Pin fastenings use elastic straps with built-in metal or plastic pins that hook into reinforced eyelet holes. Closed-fronted tendon boots are often used for cross-country riding to protect the front of the leg from knocks against solid fences.

Fetlock boots are a shorter version of a tendon boot, used on hind legs to protect the fetlocks from knocking into each other. Fetlock boots are usually open on the outside of the leg, fastening towards the rear of the leg. These can have either hook-and-loop or pin fastenings, and usually have one or two straps. For some show jumping classes, the rules on fetlock boot length and fastenings are very specific to ensure horse welfare so it is important for competitors to check the rules for their class.

=== Skid boots ===
Skid boots are used to protect a horse's hind legs during exercise and competition, protecting the fetlocks, pasterns, and other parts of the lower leg from injury that may occur from a sliding stop. They are commonly seen on horses in western riding sports such as cutting, reining and similar events where quick stops and fast turns on the hindquarters may be required. Skid boots may be made of neoprene or leather and attached with straps.

=== Knee boots ===
Knee boots, also known as knee caps and knee pads, cover the front of the knees to protect from bangs and from falls which land on the knees such as slipping on pavement. They are strapped above the knee, drape across the front of the knee, and are loosely strapped below the knee to allow for the knee to bend while still being held in position. They may be made of felt, neoprene, or leather.

=== Other boots ===
There are a variety of other boot options, including brushing and tendon hybrid boots, "sports medicine" boots, and wraps designed to act similarly to a flatwork bandage.

=== Images of boots ===
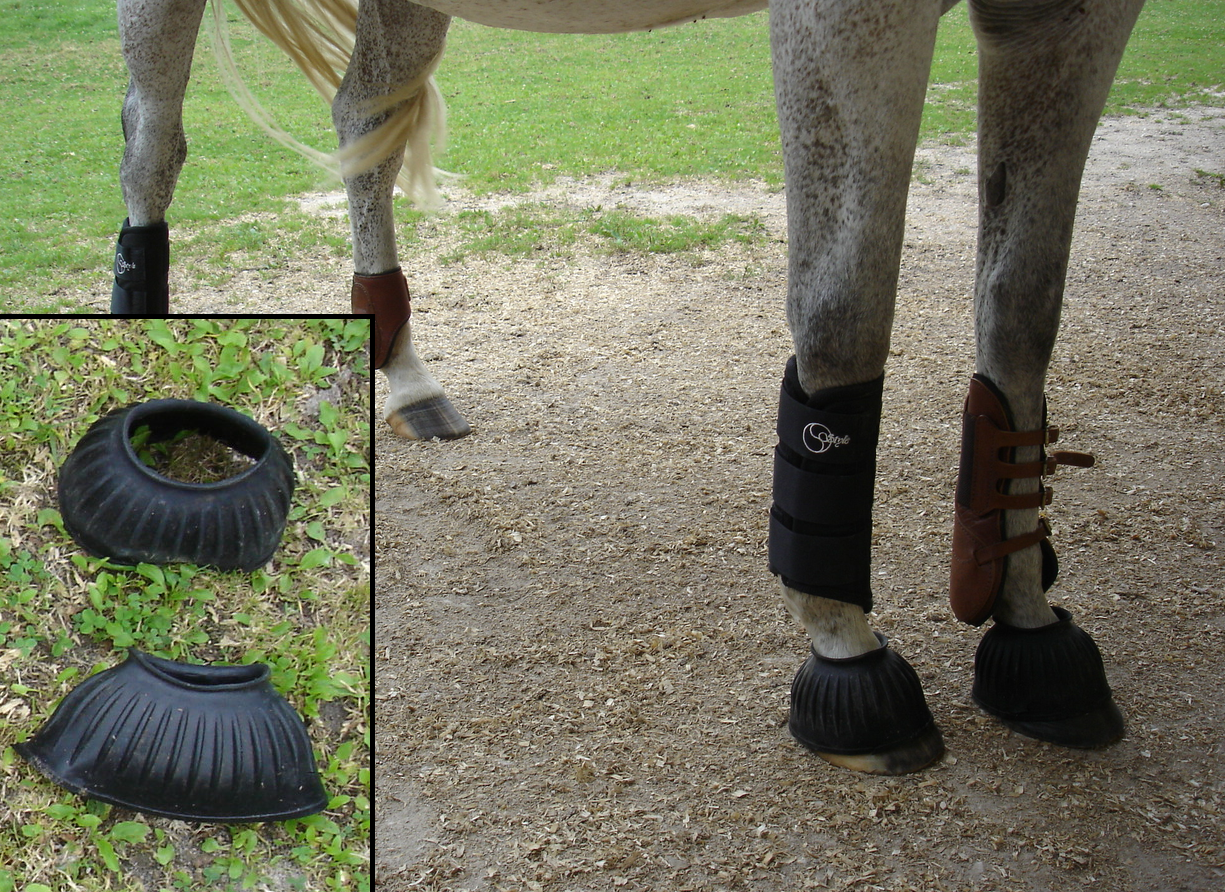
Bell boots on the front

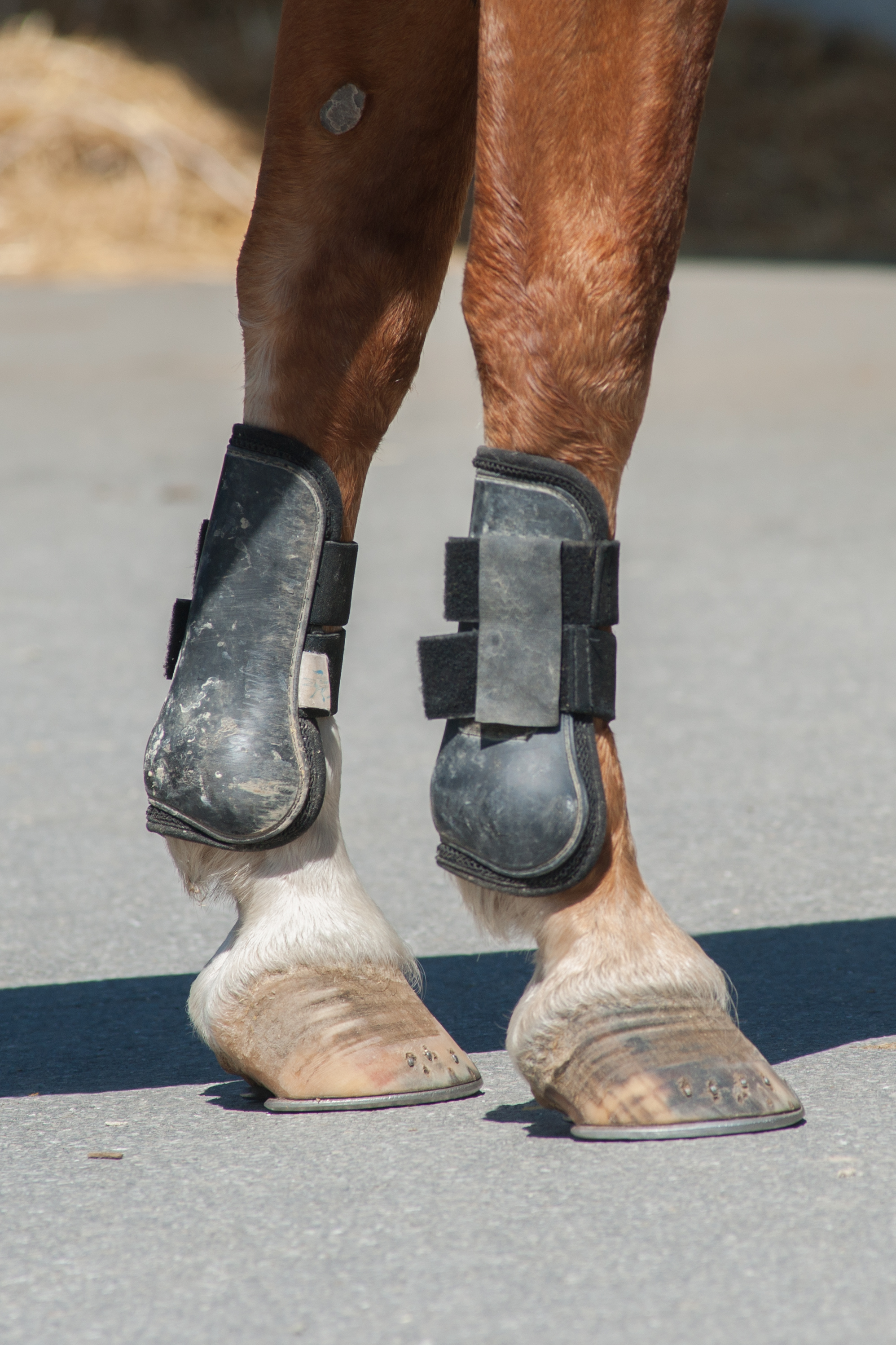
Tendon boots on front legs

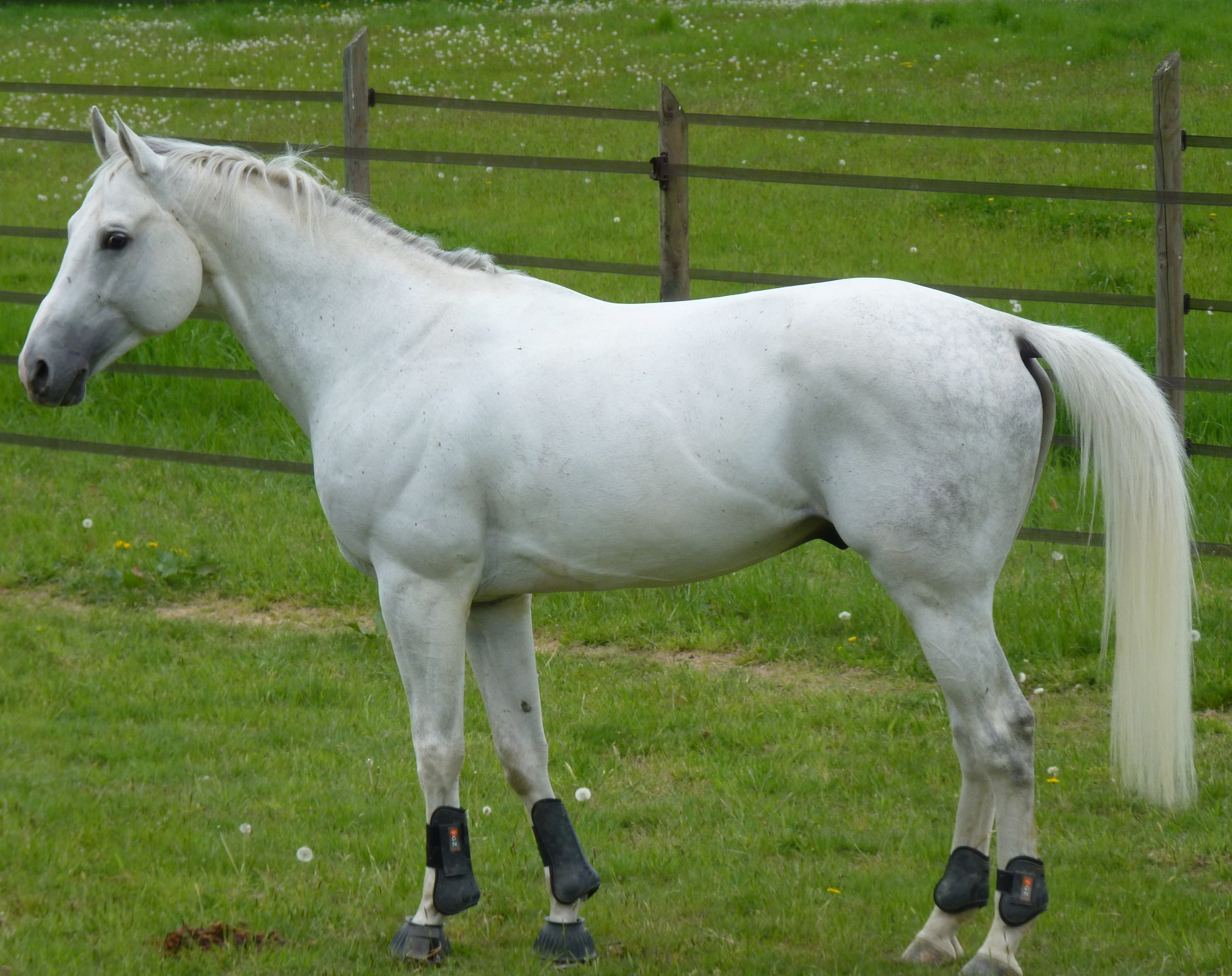
Tendon boots on front, fetlock boots on rear

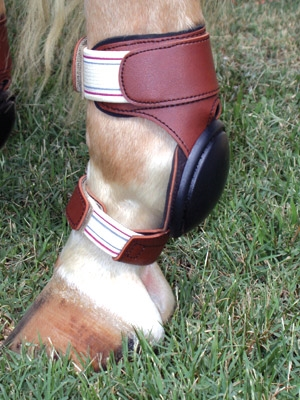
Skid boot with black protective cushion behind

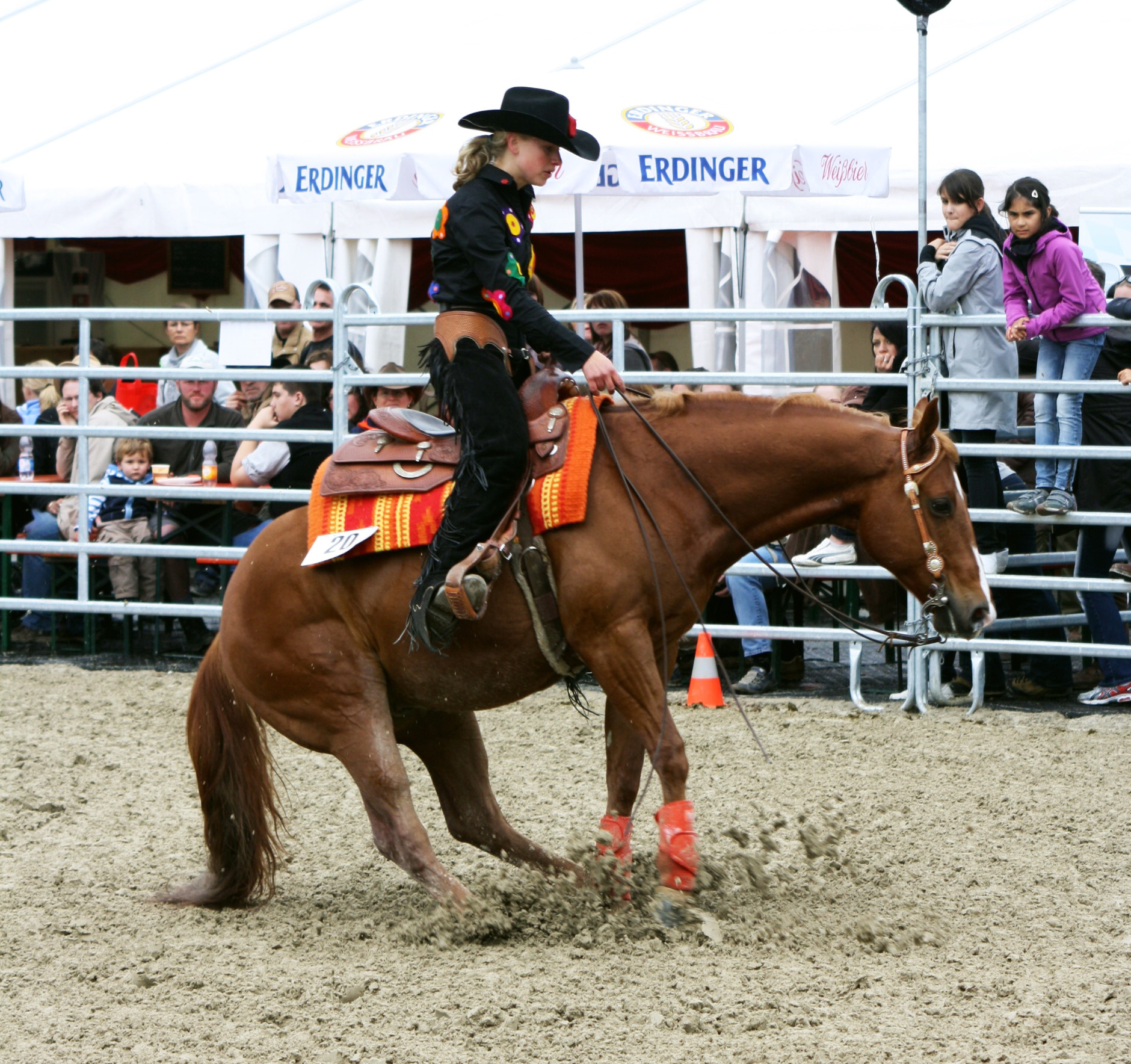
Skid boots protect the rear fetlocks during a sliding stop

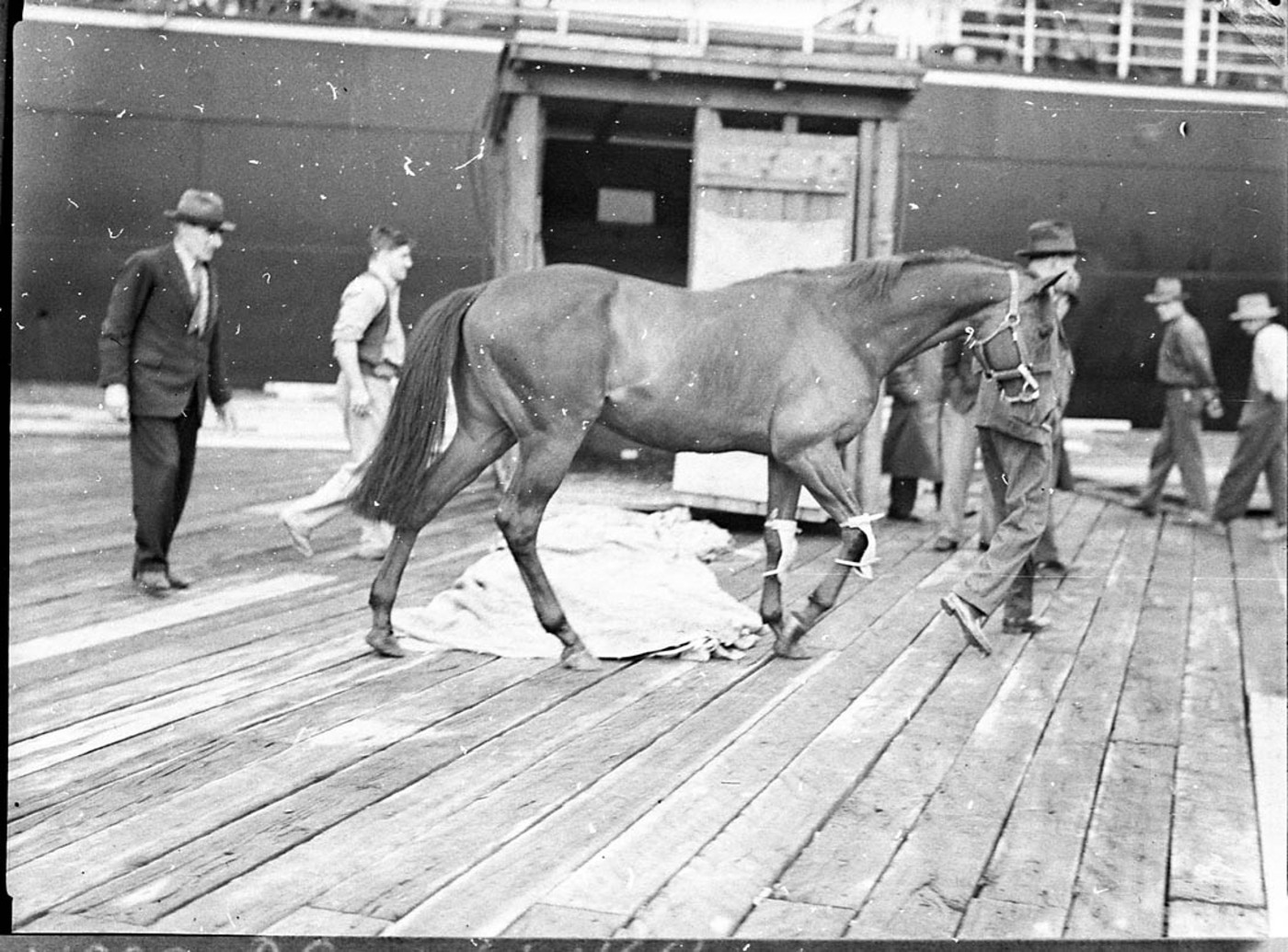
Knee guards

== Leg wraps ==
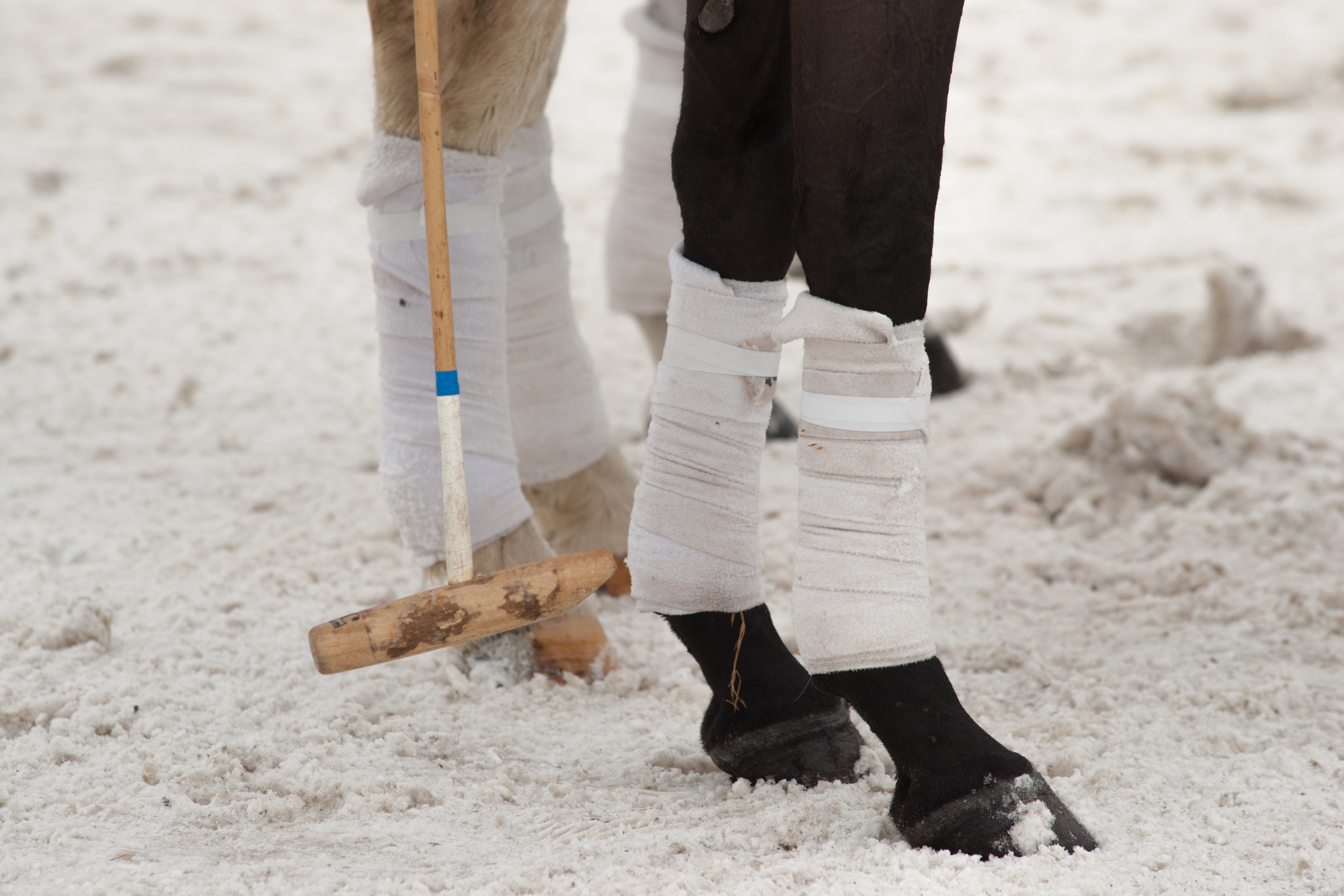
Leg wraps

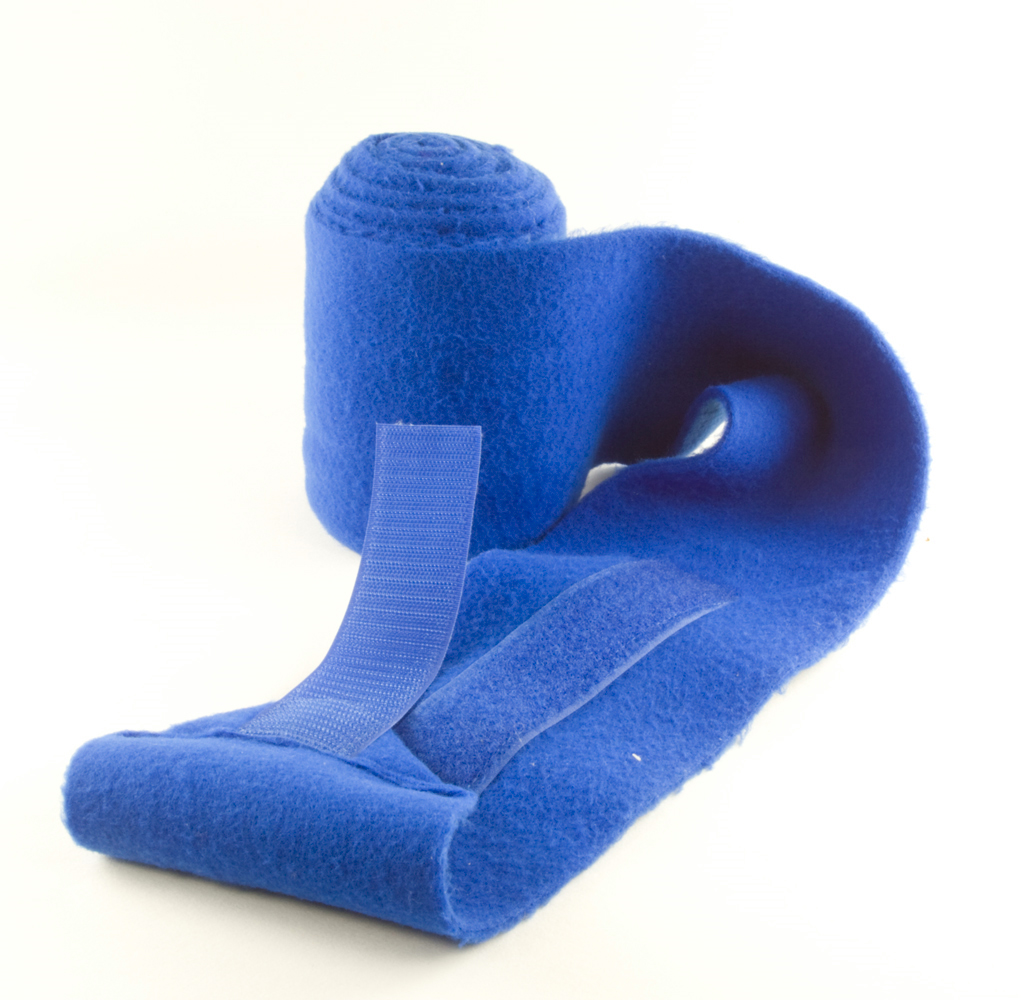
A fleece wrap

Wraps, also called bandages, are used for support and protection during exercise, for protection while transporting horses, or for therapeutic use such as covering wounds or avoiding inflammation and swelling during enforced stable rest. They are very long strips of polar fleece or elastic bandage material, wrapped around and around the horse's leg. Elastic bandages often have padding placed under them (such as Gamgee Tissue, cotton wool, felt or cotton pads), but fleece bandages rarely do. Bandages may be fastened with sewn-on hook-and-loop straps, sewn-on long straps that are tied in a bow, taped down with adhesive tape, or the material may be a cohesive bandage such as Vetwrap which adheres to itself. Bandages must be wrapped firmly to keep from unravelling, but not so tight as to unduly restrict movement, compress tendons and ligaments, or reduce blood flow in the legs.

An incorrectly applied bandage wrap may do more harm than good. If the wrap is not tight enough, the bandage may slip down and possibly trip the horse. If it is too tight, or uneven, it may cut off circulation to the lower leg, or cause "cording" or damage to the tendons (bandage bows). If too much padding is left exposed above or below the bandaging material, it may catch on something, and dislodge the bandage or frighten the horse. The fasteners of a wrap could catch on the opposite leg and dislodge or open the wrap, therefore bandages should always end on the outside of the horse's leg.

=== Exercise bandages ===
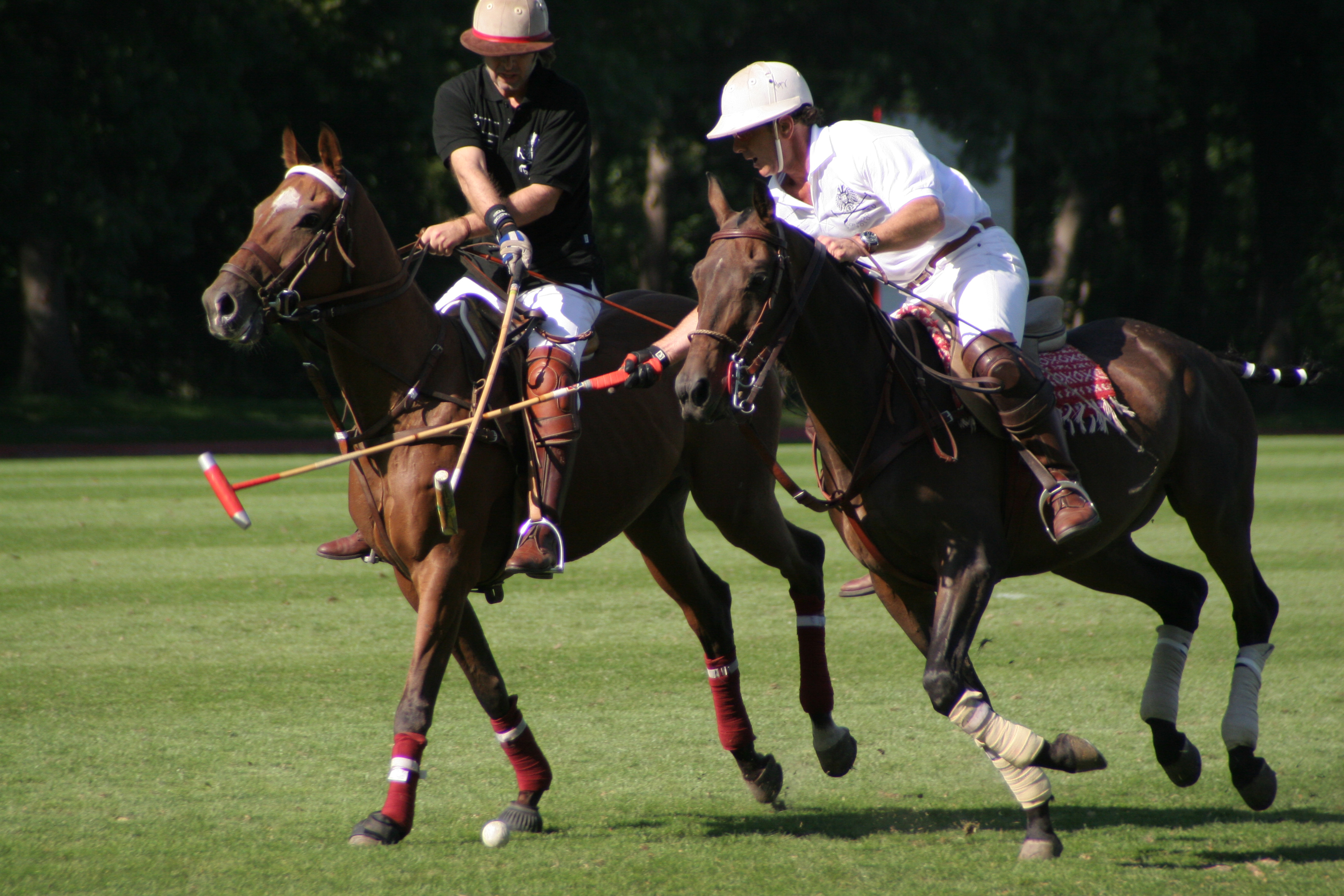
Polo wraps help protect legs from mallets, balls and collisions in the fast-paced close contact sport of polo

Exercise bandages (also called polo wraps, brace bandages and track bandages) are wrapped from the fetlock to the knee (front leg) or hock (rear leg) and are used mainly for protection during exercise. They protect against minor scrapes and bruises, help prevent irritation from sand or arena footing, and provide support and compression similar to the puttee leg wraps worn by World War I soldiers. They are often used as an alternative to boots. Exercise bandages are intended for short-term use and are not suitable to be left on overnight.

=== Shipping bandages ===
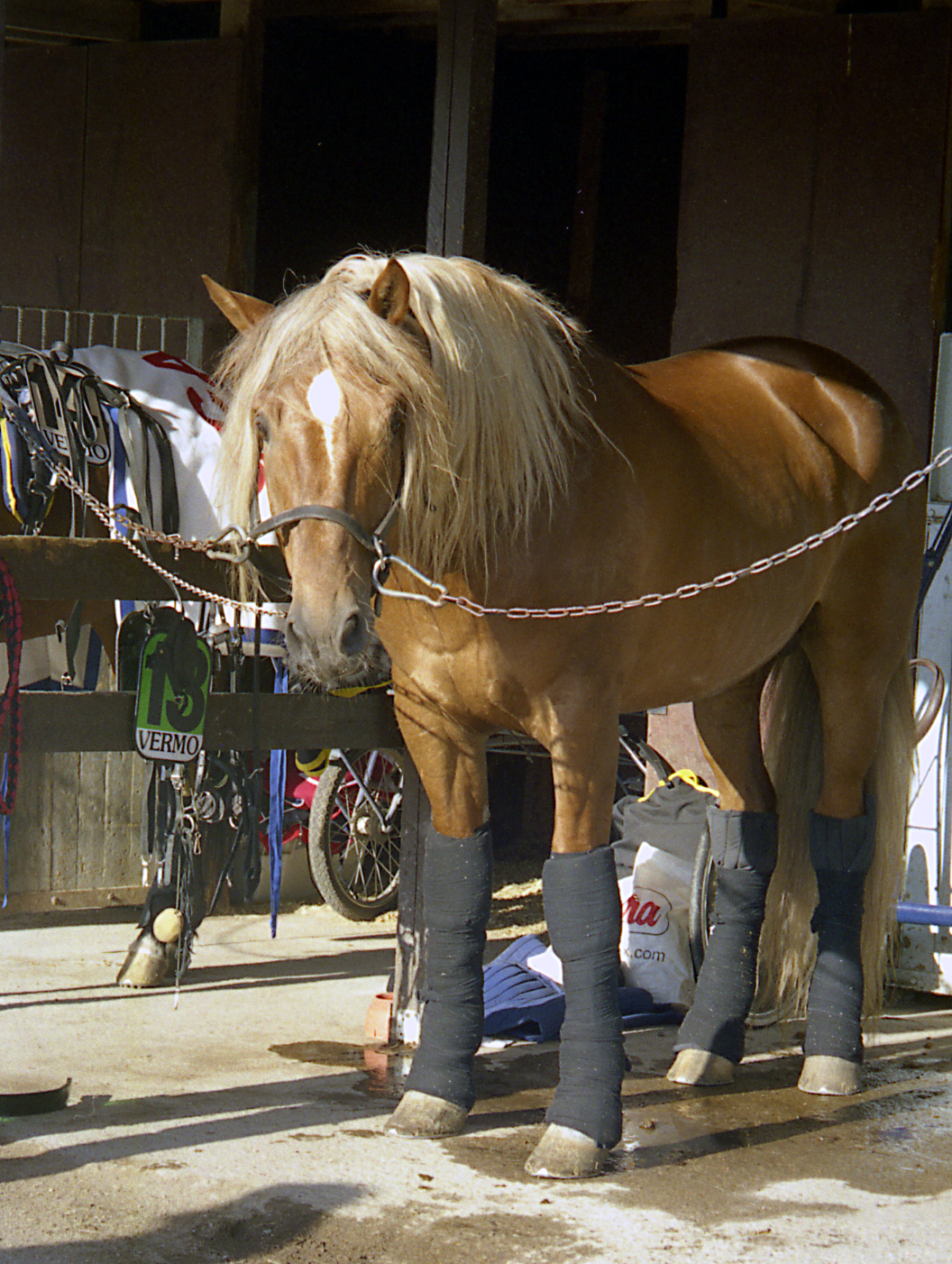
Shipping wraps

A shipping bandage, shipping boot, or shipping wrap, is a wrap or boot used on the lower legs to protect those while travelling in a horse trailer or other conveyance. The bandage starts just below the knee or hock, and ends at the floor, protecting the cannon bone, tendons of the lower leg, fetlock, pastern, coronet, and heels of the horse. Some boot designs extend slightly above the knee and hock, offering protection to the joints in the event the horse bumps those on the sides of the trailer.

=== Stable bandages ===
A stable bandage or standing bandage runs from just below the knee or hock to the bottom of the fetlock joint, and protects the cannon bone, tendons of the lower leg, and fetlock joint. Stable bandages offer some protection against minor cuts and bruises in the stable, and can reduce or prevent edema in the legs after hard work, or when a horse is kept standing in a stall for long periods of time.

=== Medical use ===
Stable bandages can be used to hold a poultice on the lower legs, or to hold a dressing on a wound. They can be used to cover wounds to prevent contamination by dirt, urine and feces through contact with stall bedding. They are sometimes used as a base of support for bandages higher up on the leg (such as the knee, hock or even higher) and in this case the lower leg wrap can help prevent swelling from the injury from traveling down the leg.

When a horse injures a leg, it often places more weight and stress on the uninjured leg. To prevent the uninjured leg from swelling, it should also be bandaged to provide support. So both front legs, both hind legs, or all four legs should be bandaged.

== See also ==
- Limbs of the horse
- Hoof boot
