= Acetabular fracture =

Broken bone in acetabular portion of hip bone

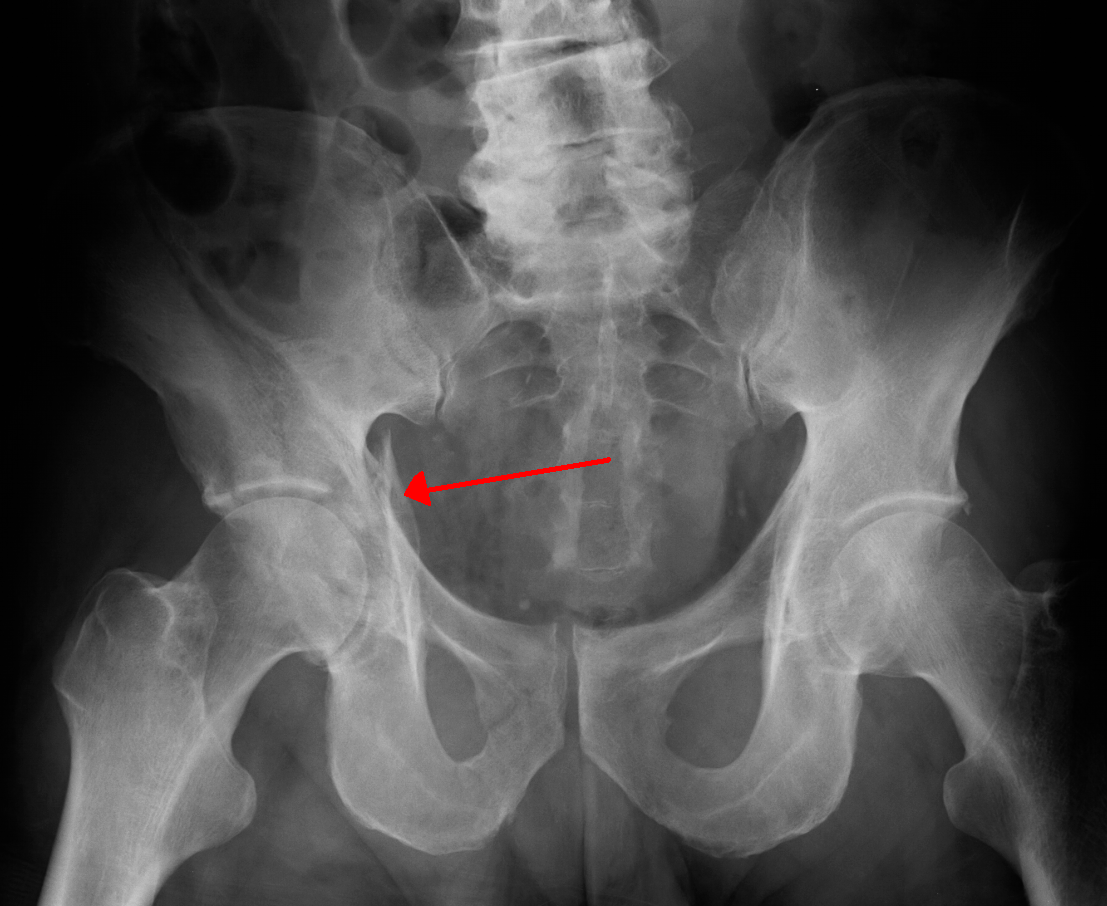
- Acetabular fracture as seen on plain X-ray

Fractures of the acetabulum occur when the head of the femur is driven into the pelvis, thus applying extreme pressure. This injury is caused by a blow to either the side or front of the knee, can be accompanied by a femoral fracture, and often occurs as a high-energy trauma, such as dashboard injury in a head-on car collision, a feet-first fall down stairs or from height, or even while practicing extreme sports. In older individuals or those with osteoporosis, a trivial fall may result in an acetabular fracture.

The acetabulum is a cavity situated on the outer surface of the hip bone, also called the coxal bone or innominate bone. It is made up of three bones, the ilium, ischium, and pubis. Together, the acetabulum and the head of the femur form the hip joint.

Major complications of these fractures mainly include osteoarthritis, due to cartilage damage, heterotopic ossification and sciatic nerve damage, which can be either traumatic or iatrogenic.

In 1964, French surgeons Robertt Judet, Jean Judet, and Emile Letournel first described the mechanism, classification, and treatment of acetabular fractures. They classified them into elementary fractures (simple, two part) and associated fractures (complex, three or more part).

== Judet-Letournel classification ==
Elementary fracture	Description	Associated fractures	Description
Posterior wall	This is the most common variety of acetabular fracture. It typically occurs due to dashboard injury; when a person travelling in a vehicle involved in a head-on collision, the force applied over the flexed knee travels along the femur bone to the head of the femur, breaking the posterior wall of the acetabulum. The head of the femur is dislocated outside the joint.	T shape	When a transverse fracture also had a vertical fracture line, it is called a T shape fracture. Here the innominate bone is broken in such a way that all three parts of it, the ilium, the ischium and the pubis are separated from one another. This is a three part fracture. Though both columns are broken, the weight bearing dome is still attached to the main part of the ilium and hence it is not a true fracture of both columns. This fracture may be associated with a fracture through the posterior wall as well, making it more complex. This fracture typically occurs when the injuring force is applied from the side, against the greater trochanter of the femur, as in a fall on the side or being hit on the side. This force may be combined with dashboard injury as well. The fracture is best seen in anteroposterior view and iliac and obturator oblique views.
Posterior column	As with posterior wall injury, this also typically occurs due to dash board injury.	Posterior column + Posterior wall	These fractures are extensions of elementary fractures. With the involvement of the posterior wall, the difficulty in treatment increases. These fractures are rarely amenable to non-surgical treatment. Due to posterior wall fracture, the hip is usually dislocated posteriorly, requiring immediate reduction of dislocation and surgical reconstruction after a few days. The posterior column with posterior wall fracture occurs due to dashboard injury. The anteroposterior view may give clues to these injuries. Judet views and CT scans help in knowing the extent of the injury.
Anterior wall	This fracture is uncommon, typically occurring when the injuring force is applied from the side, against the greater trochanter of the femur bone, as in a fall on the side or being hit on the side.	Transverse + posterior wall	These fractures are extension of elementary fractures. With involvement of posterior wall, the difficulty in treatment increases. These fractures are rarely amenable to non-surgical treatment. Due to posterior wall fracture, the hip is usually dislocated posteriorly, requiring immediate reduction of dislocation and surgical reconstruction after few days. Occurs due to combined dash board injury and direct injury to the hip from the side.
Anterior column	This fracture is uncommon, typically occurring when the injuring force is applied from the side, against the greater trochanter of the femur bone, as in a fall on the side or being hit on the side. Depending on the location, the fractures are described as very low, low, intermediate and high anterior column fracture.	Anterior column + posterior hemi transverse	In this variety of fractures, the posterior or ilio ischial column is broken as a transverse fracture, while the anterior or ilio pubic column is broken into multiple pieces. Part of the weight-bearing dome in this variety of fractures is still attached to that part of the iliac wing, which forms part of the iliac joint. This type of injury has to be differentiated from both column fractures, where the weight-bearing dome is a floating piece not attached directly to the bone-forming sacroiliac joint. Typically, it is caused by a combination of forces acting on the hip through the femoral head. All three X-ray views plus a CT scan are a must for the diagnosis and management of this complex injury. In this injury, non-operative treatment rarely gives satisfactory results. Surgical management is ideal. The choice of approach rests with the surgeon but going from the front or anterior approach is necessary. The posterior injury may be tacked with the anterior approach by an experienced surgeon. If the patient is unfit to undergo major surgery due to any reason, longitudinal traction to achieve secondary congruence of the hip may help to restore hip function, though partially.
Transverse	In this variety of fracture, the innominate bone is broken such that the upper part consists of ilium with weight bearing dome and the lower part consists of ischium and pubic bones. It typically occurs when the injuring force is applied from the side, against the greater trochanter of the femur bone, as in a fall on the side or being hit on the side. This is a two part fracture, but though both columns are broken, it is not a true both-column fracture, as the weight bearing dome is still attached to main ilium. In this variety of fracture, the innominate bone is broken such that the upper part consists of ilium with weight bearing dome and the lower part consists of ischium and pubic bones. It typically occurs when the injuring force is applied from the side, against the greater trochanter of the femur bone, as in a fall on the side or being hit on the side. This is a two part fracture, but though both columns are broken, it is not a true both-column fracture, as the weight bearing dome is still attached to main ilium. Depending on the level at which the fracture line passes in relation to weight bearing area, the transverse fracture is further subdivided into types: 1. Infra tectal: below the weight bearing dome 2. Juxta tectal: just at the level of the weight bearing dome 3. Trans tectal: passing through the weight bearing dome; Diagnosis X-ray visualization is best done in Antero posterior view and Iliac and obturator oblique views. In CT scan the characteristic feature is that the fracture line runs from front to back. CT scan also helps in identifying impaction of bone pieces and if there are pieces in the joint	Combined both column fractures	These are the most complex injuries. Here the weight bearing roof or dome of the acetabulum is a floating piece. This adds to complexity of management. Diagnosis All three x-ray views plus CT scan is a must for diagnosis and management of this complex injury. Treatment Like any other acetabular fracture, if the femoral head is dislocated out of the socket, early reduction into socket is a priority. However, in this injury, non-operative treatment rarely gives satisfactory results. Surgical management is ideal. The choice of approach rests with the surgeon, but going from front, or anterior approach is must. The posterior injury may be tacked with anterior approach by experienced surgeon. If the patient is unfit to undergo major surgery due to any reason, longitudinal traction to achieve secondary congruence of hip may help to restore hip function, though partially.

== Presentation ==
=== Associated injuries and complications ===
The broken bone pieces or the dislocated head of the femur may injure the sciatic nerve, causing paralysis of the foot; the patient may or may not recover sensation in the foot, depending on the extent of injury to the nerve. The posterior wall fragment may be one large piece, or multiple pieces, and may be associated with impaction of the bone. Sciatic nerve injury and stoppage of blood supply to the femoral head at the time of accident or during surgery to treat the injury may occur. Deep vein thrombosis and pulmonary embolism are other complications that may occur in any type of injury to the acetabulum. A common postoperative complication is heterotopic ossification around the injured hip joint.

== Anatomy ==
To understand the fracture pattern of a fractured acetabulum, it is essential to have minimum three x-ray views, though use of CT scan with 3-D reconstruction of images has made understanding of these fractures easier.

1. Pelvis with both hips antero posterior view. This view shows six important landmarks of the acetabulum, specifically:
  - Pelvic brim
  - Ilio ischial line
  - Tear drop
  - Anterior wall
  - Posterior wall
  - Weight bearing dome
2. Iliac oblique view. This view shows the whole of the ilium, the posterior column, and the anterior wall
3. Obturator oblique view. Shows the anterior column and the posterior wall.

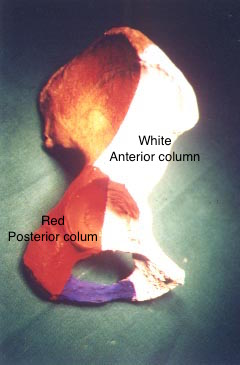
White: Anterior column, Red: Posterior column

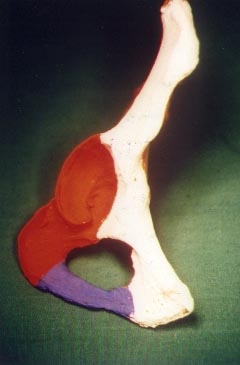
Obturator view showing Anterior column and Posterior wall

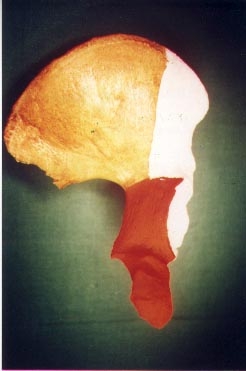
Iliac oblique view showing Posterior column and Anterior wall

=== Patterns of fracture ===
Tile's classification of acetabular fracture:

- I - Simple fracture, anterior or posterior wall column
- II - Transverse fracture
- III - T - Type fracture involving two columns
- IV - Both columns fractures, floating acetabulum

== Diagnosis ==
Ideal x-ray visualization of an elementary fracture will depend on the fracture type:

- Posterior wall fracture: Iliac oblique and obturator oblique views
- Posterior column fracture: Iliac oblique and obturator oblique views
- Anterior wall fracture: Iliac oblique view
- Anterior column fracture: Obturator oblique view

In all cases, CT scan can assist in identifying impacted bone pieces, which may be found within the joint, and MRI may be done to identify the extent of potential injury to the sciatic nerve.

== Treatment ==
If the femur head is dislocated, it should be reduced as soon as possible, to prevent damage to its blood supply. This is preferably done under anaesthesia, following which, leg is kept pulled by applying traction to prevent joint from dislocating.

The final management depends on the size of the fragment(s), stability and congruence of the joint. In some cases traction for six to eight weeks may be the only treatment required; however, surgical fixation using screw(s) and plate(s) may be required if the injury is more complex. The latter treatment will be called for if bone fragments do not fall into place, or if they are found in the joint, or if the joint itself is unstable.

=== Post-surgery ===
Depending on the stability achieved via initial treatment, the patient may be allowed to stand and walk with help of support within about six to eight weeks. Full function may return in about three months.

=== Principles of management ===
At the site of injury: After stabilizing an injured person and resuscitation, quick examination is done to check injury to vital organs.

If one suspects injury to the hip, it is imperative to immobilise the limb using some kind of support to prevent movements of the injured limb to prevent further damage

A trained paramedic may be able to diagnose hip dislocation by noticing the position of the injured limb. It is essential to document status of nerves and vessels before starting any treatment to protect oneself from litigation

On arrival at the hospital, trained trauma surgeon will assess the patient and prescribe necessary tests including x-rays as described earlier.

Non-surgical management consists of reducing the dislocated joint by maneuver under anaesthesia and applying traction to the limb to maintain position of joint and fractured bones. If non surgical management is preferred it may require six weeks to 3 months for recovery.

==== Surgical management ====
The surgical management requires high degree of training and well equipped centre. It should be carried out by experienced surgical team to get best results. The principles laid down for management are;

- Anatomic reduction of the fractured fragments
- Stable fixation
- Congruent joint
- Early mobilization
- Delayed weight bearing

Innominate bone is a flat bone with many curves. In most part the bone is thick enough and has broad surfaces that are amenable to primary fixation using lag screw(s) and to neutralize forces across the bone one needs to add plate(s) on the surface of the fractured fragments for it to heal without deformity.

Before surgery, patient needs tests to check fitness for surgery

Anaesthesia : the surgery may be performed either under regional anaesthesia or general anaesthesia

Surgical approaches. Following are the common approaches;

- Kocher Langenbeck approach for posterior injuries
- Ili inguinal, Ilio femoral of modified stoppa's approach for anterior or combined injuries

Implants : normally lag screws and reconstruction plates are preferred implants

Post operative management: would involve initial period or bed rest, followed by mobilisation by trained therapist

Total time to recover may be up to 3 months

Elderly patients have worse outcomes than other populations. Studies show that over 20 percent will require subsequent total hip arthroplasty.

== Gallery ==
Acetabular fracture
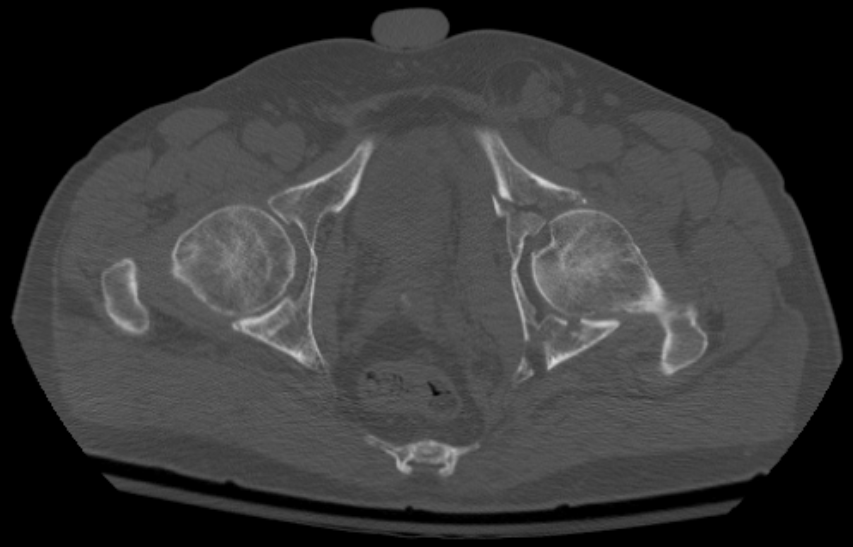
Axial CT image (viewed on bone windows) of a complex comminuted left acetabular fracture involving both anterior and posterior columns.

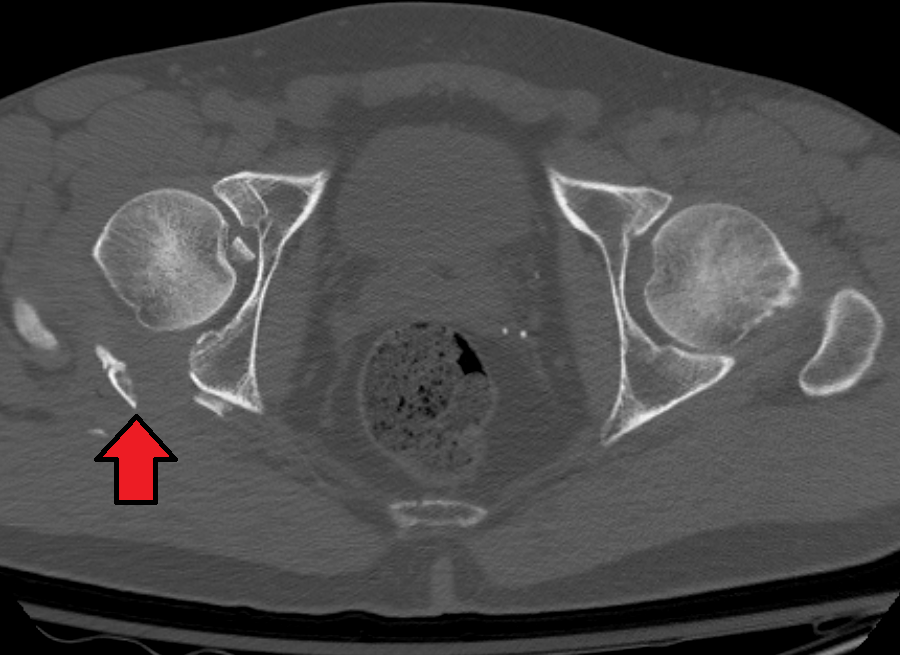
Fracture of the acetabulum

=== Elementary fractures ===
Posterior wall fracture
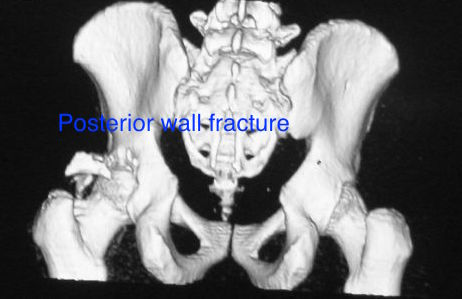
Posterior wall fracture as seen on 3-D CT scan

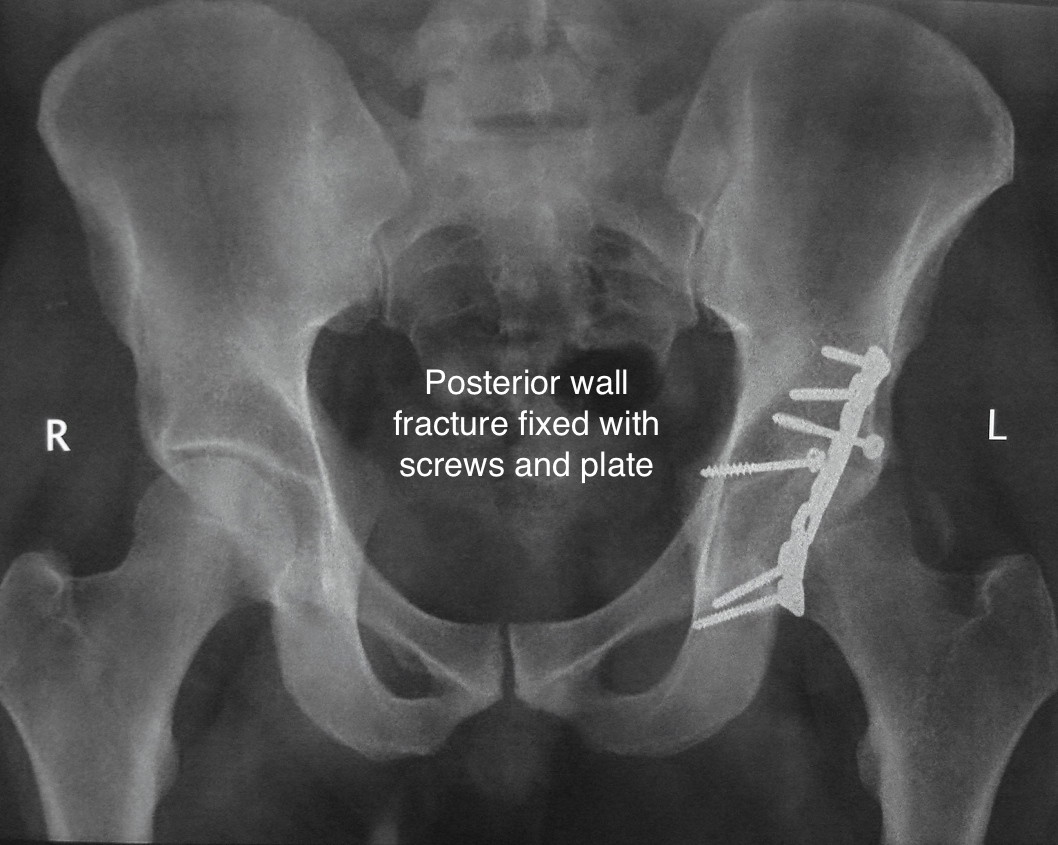
Posterior wall fracture fixed with screws and plate

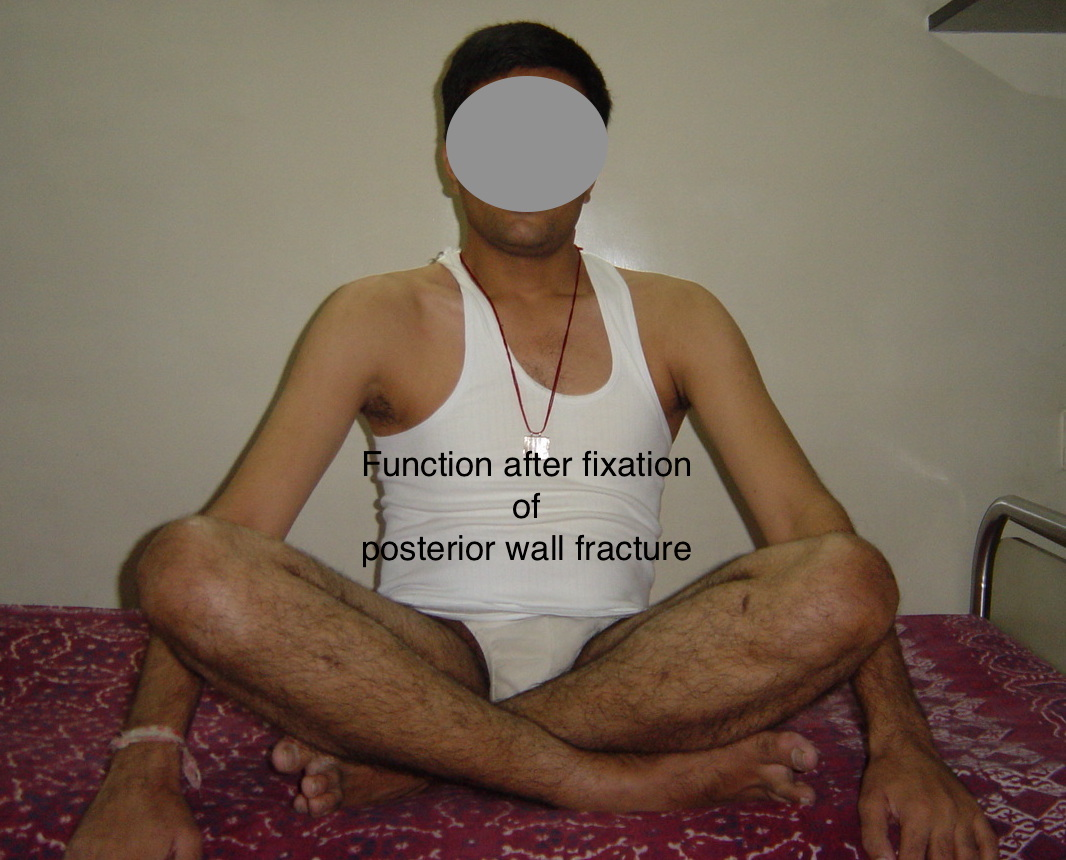
Function after fixation
Anterior wall fracture
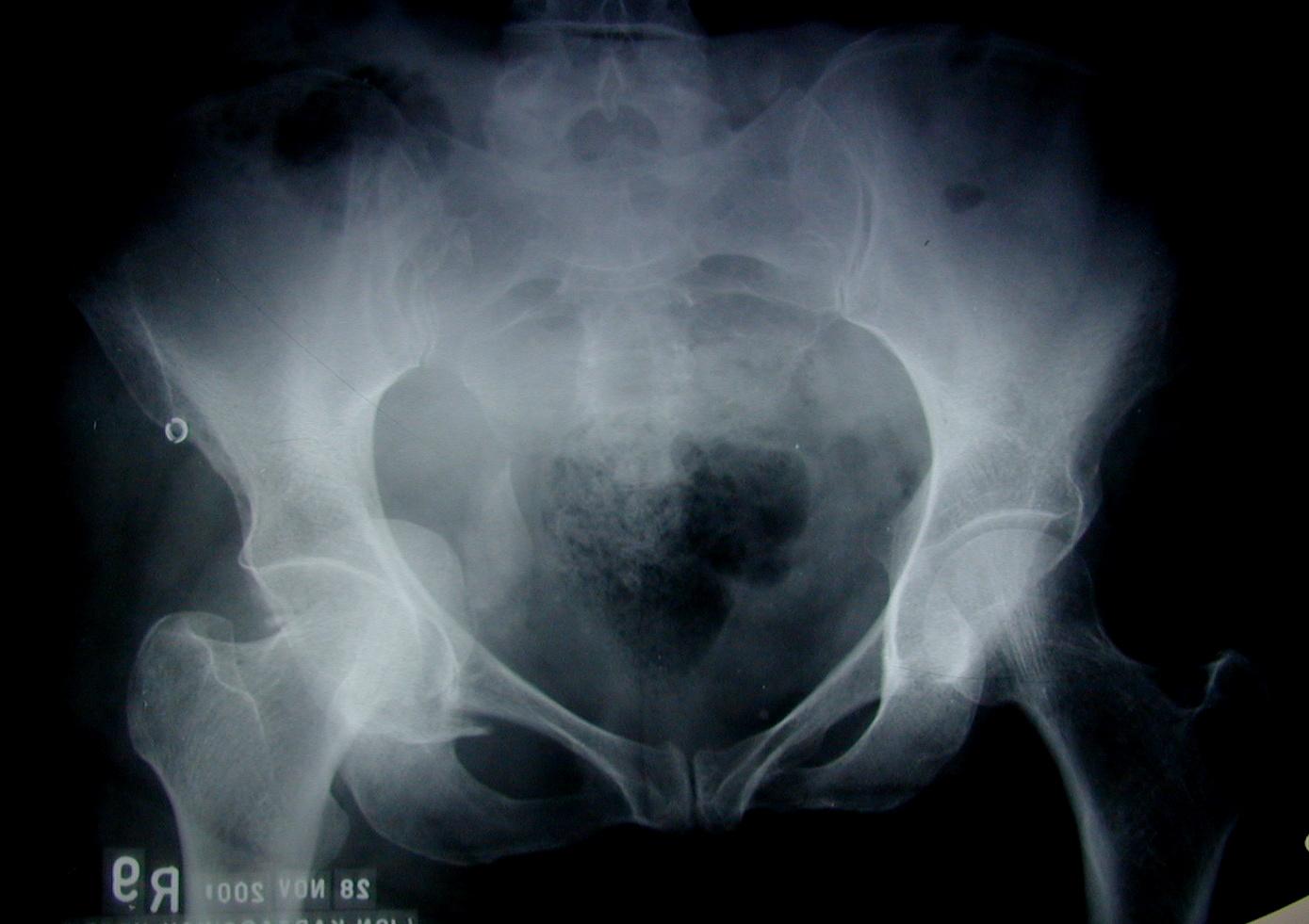
Anterior wall fracture

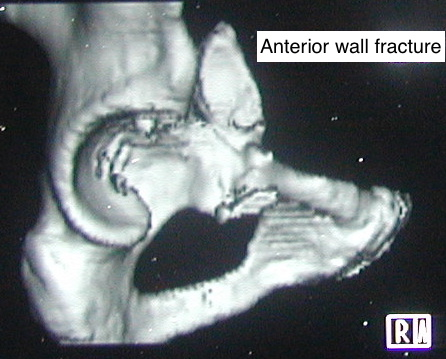
As seen on 3D CT image

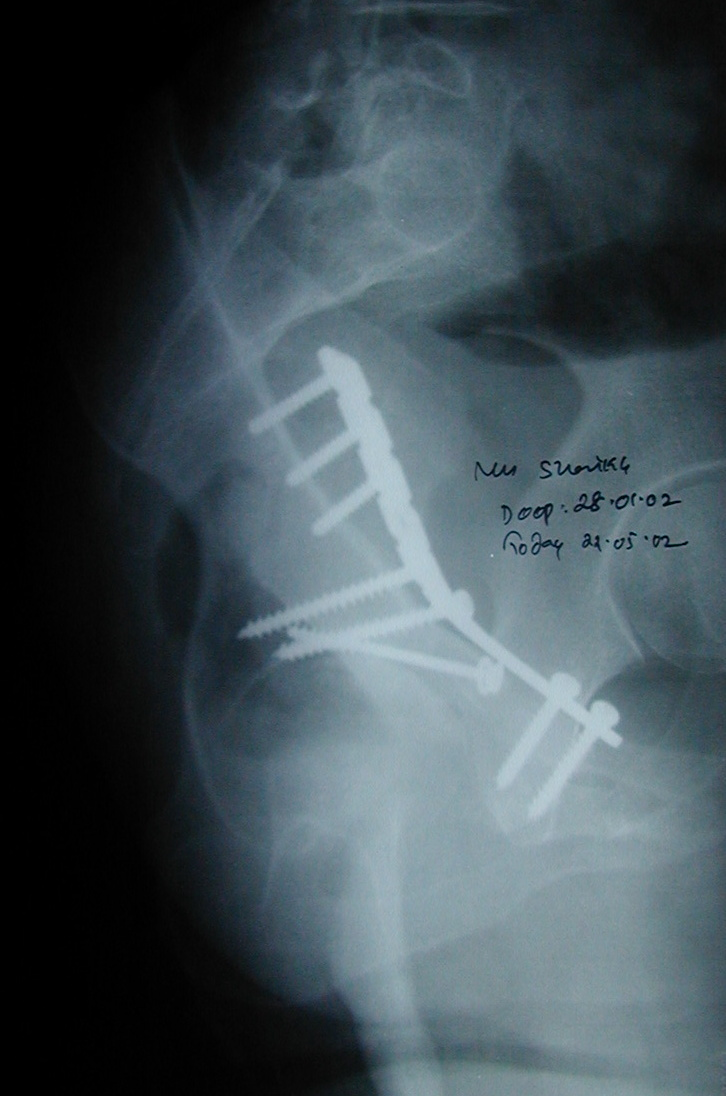
Fixation with screws and plate
Anterior column fracture
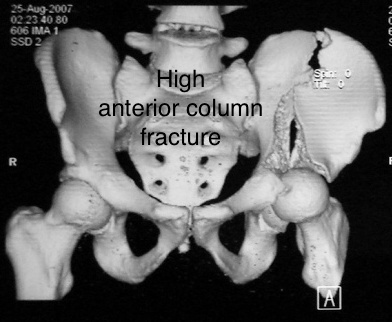
High anterior column fracture 3 D CT scan picture

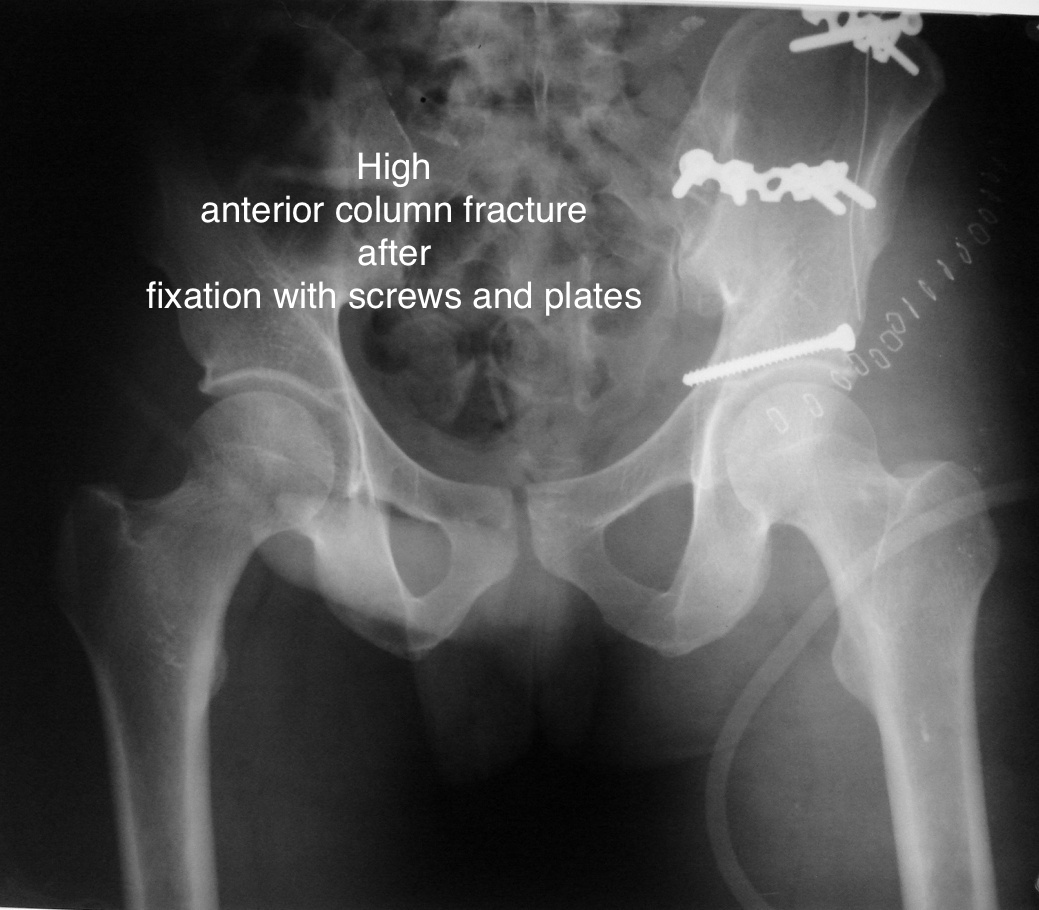
High anterior column fracture after fixation with screws and plates
Transverse fracture
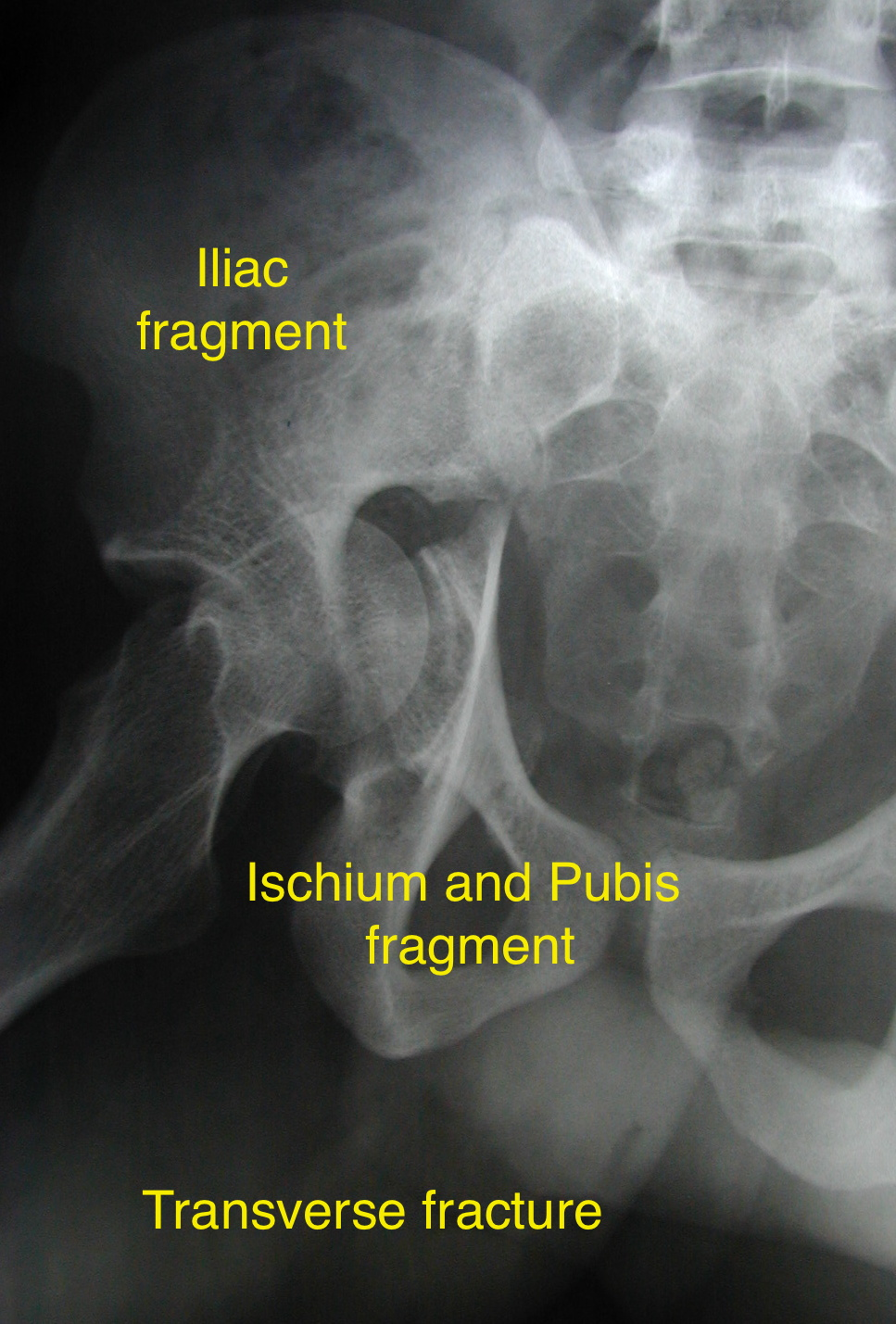
Transverse fracture showing upper iliac fragment, lower ischial and pubic fragment

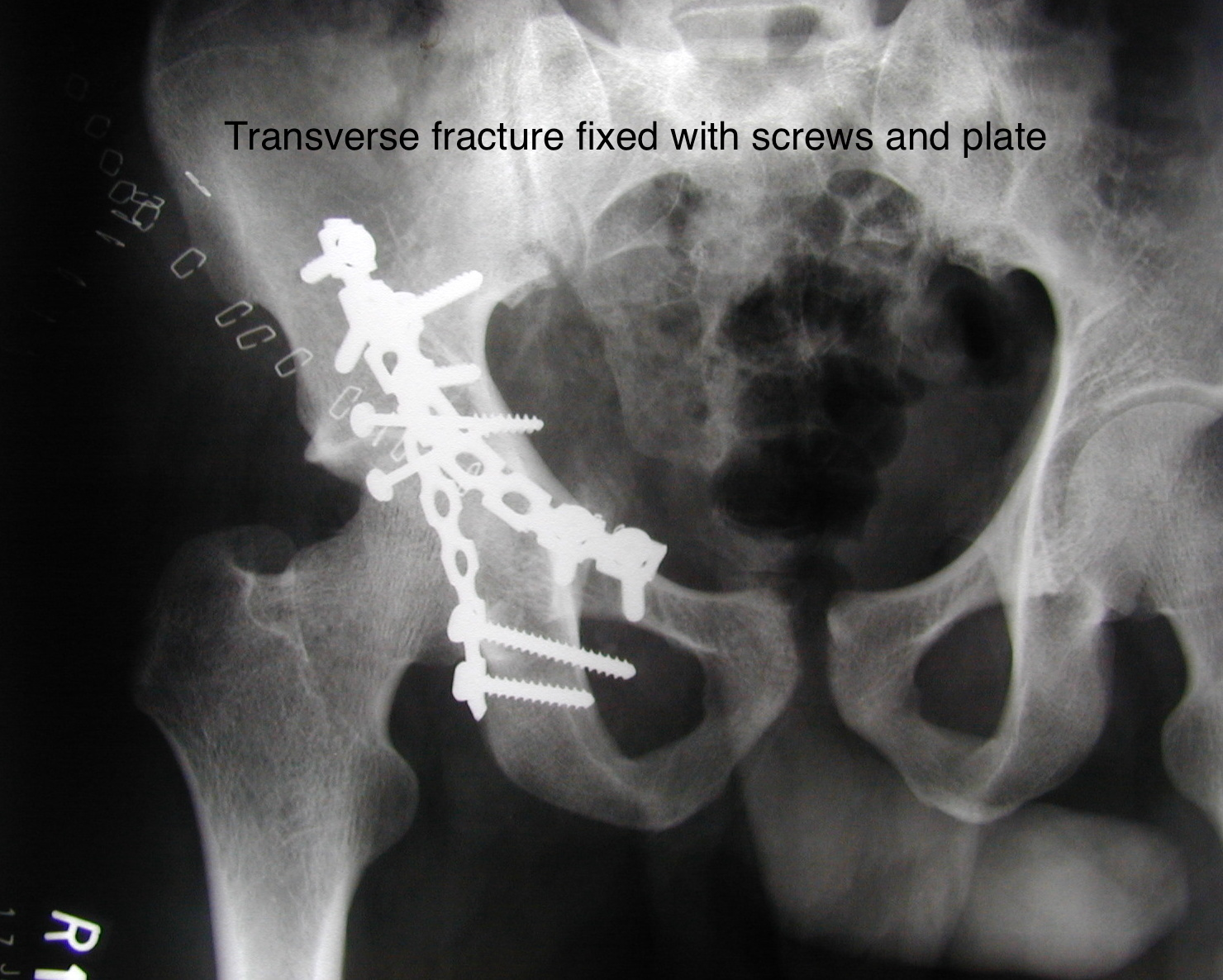
Transverse fracture fixed with screws and plate

=== Associated fractures ===
T-shaped fracture (associated with Posterior wall fracture)
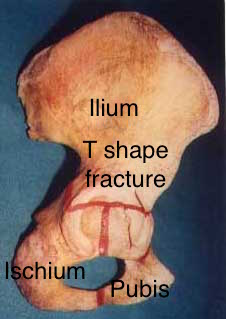
T shape fracture shown on bone model

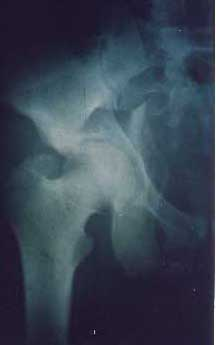
X-ray of T shape fracture
Posterior column with posterior wall (associated with Posterior column fracture)
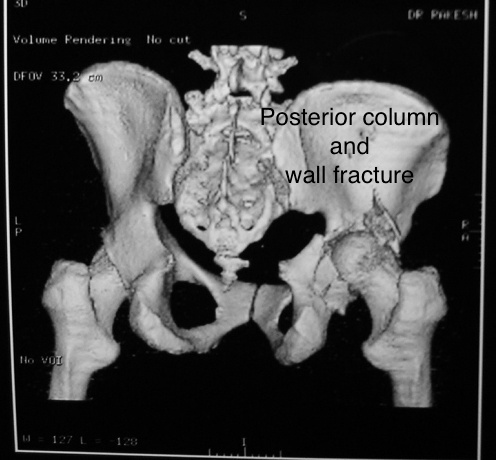
Posterior column and wall fracture as seen on 3D CT

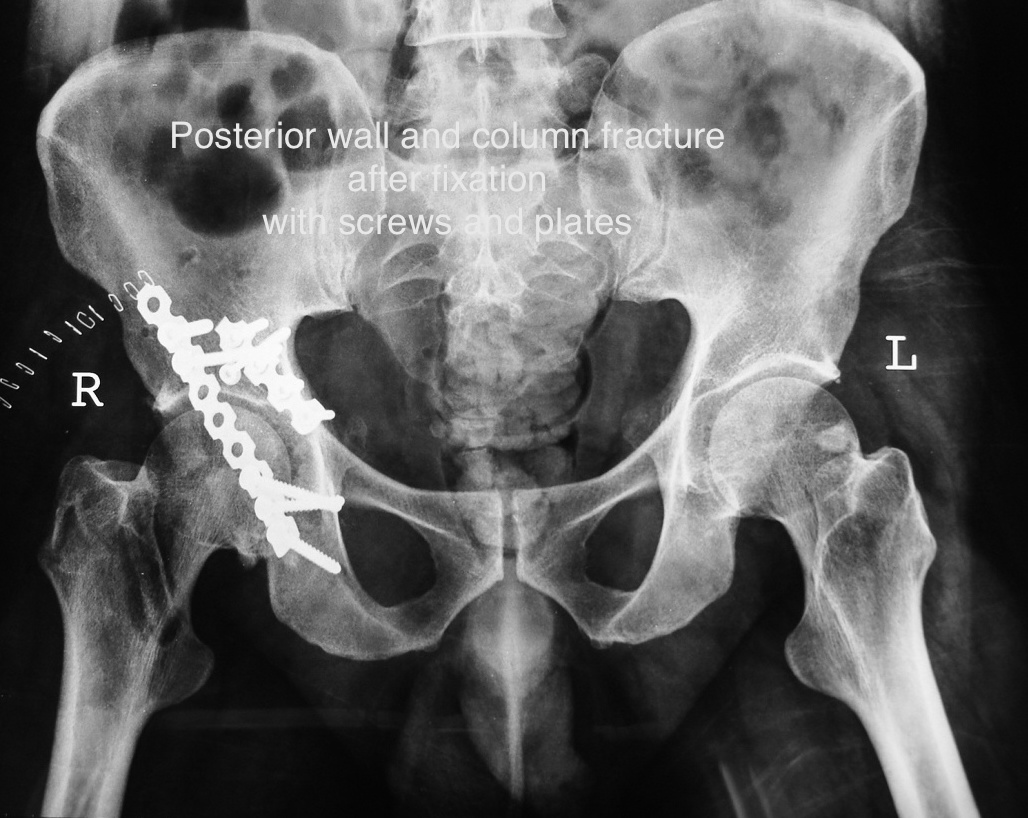
Posterior column and wall fixed using screws and plates
combined both column fractures (associated with Transverse fracture)
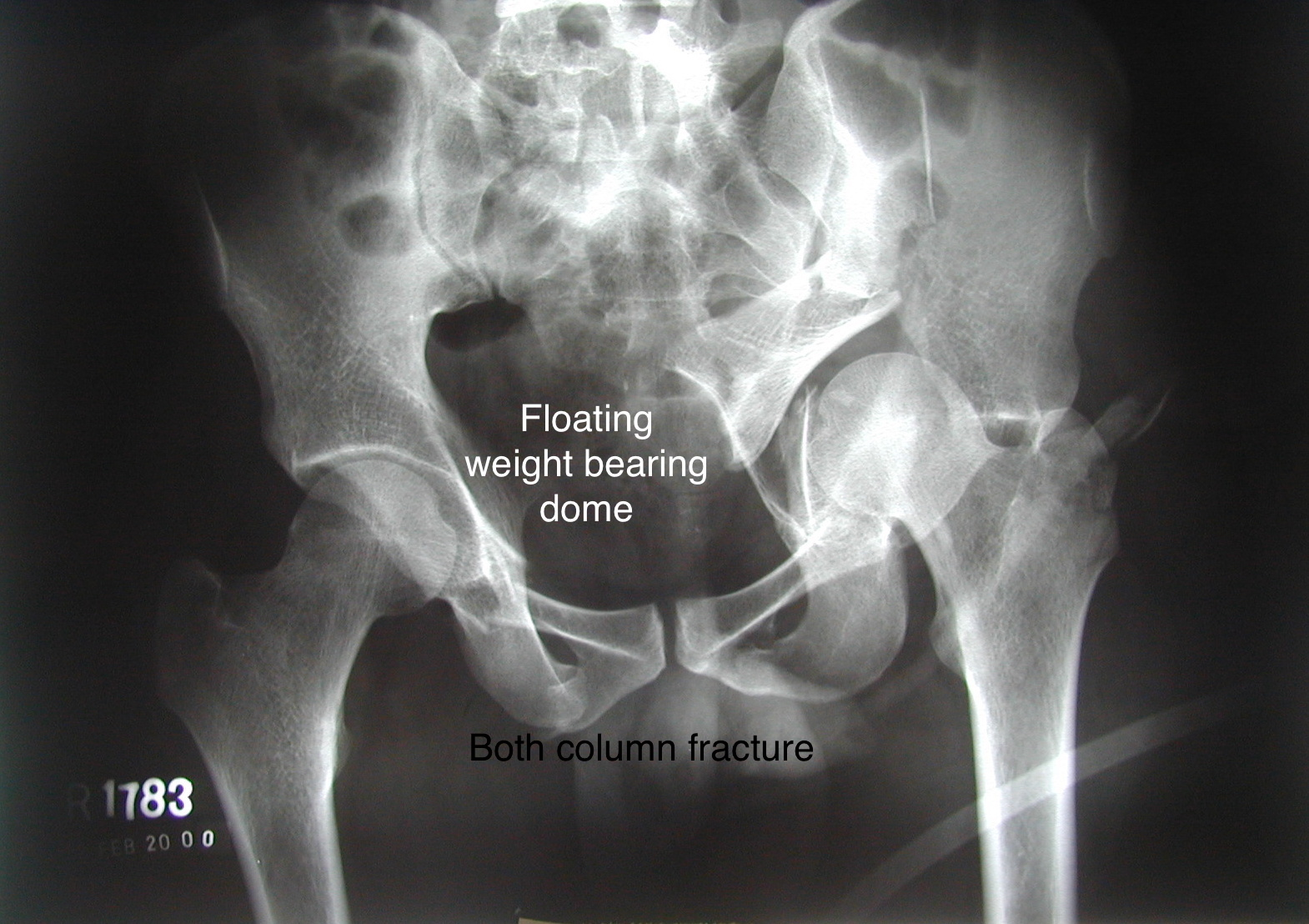
Both column fracture showing floating weight bearing dome

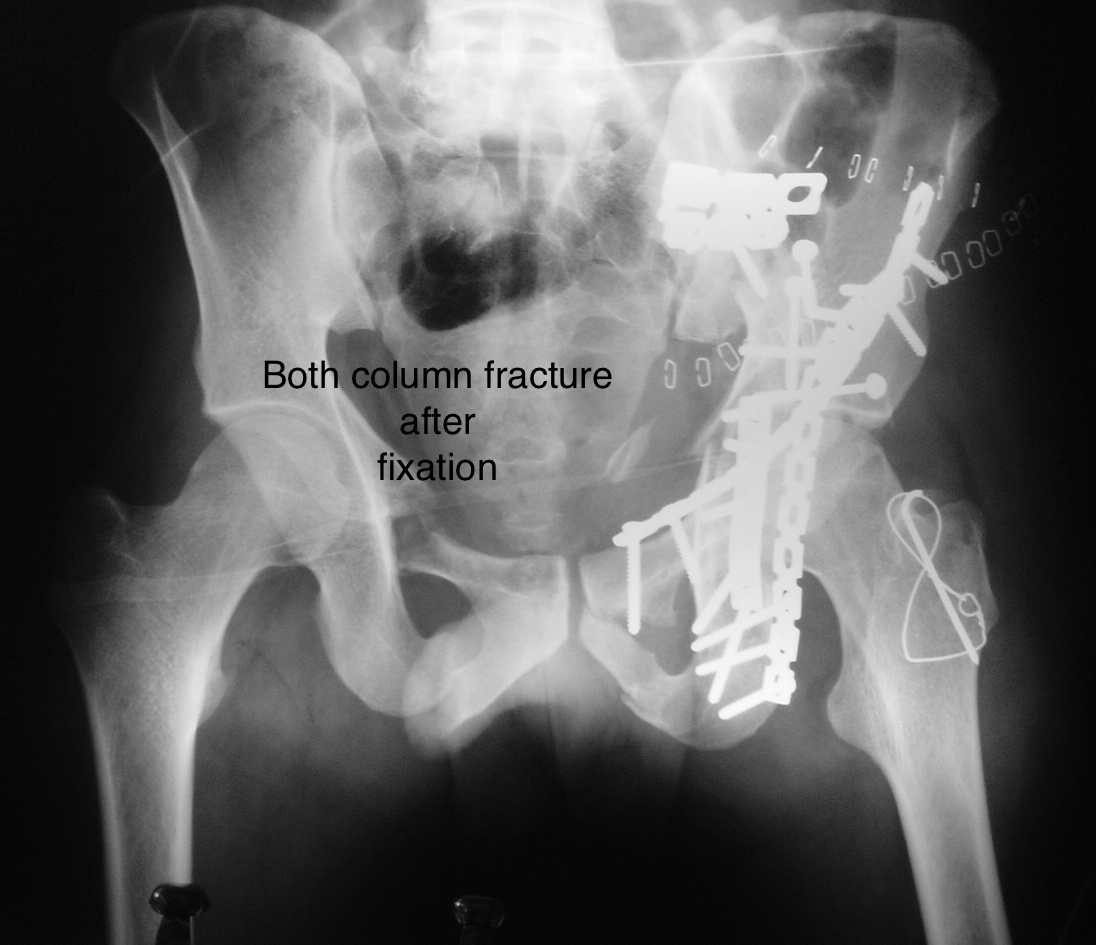
Both column fracture after fixation with screws and plates

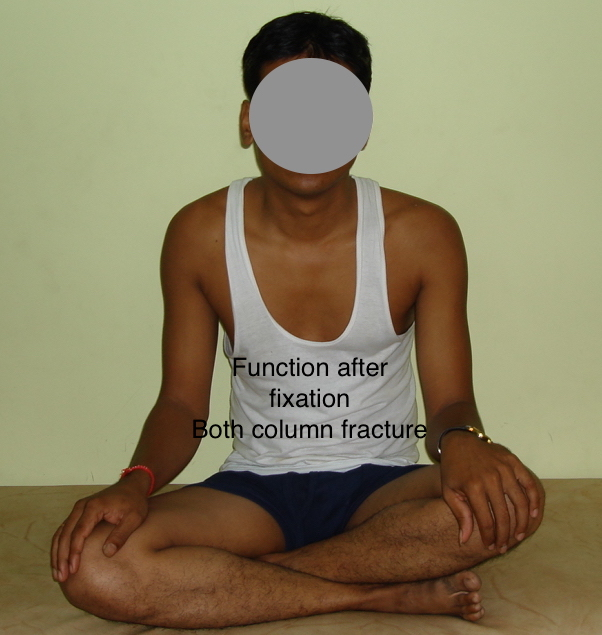
Function after fixation both column fracture

1.	Matta JM, Anderson LM, Epstein HC, Hendricks P. Fractures of acetabulum: a retrospective analysis. Clin Orthop 1986; 205:230.
2.	Rowe CR, Lowell JD. Prognosis of fractures of acetabulum. J Bone Joint Surg [Am] 1961; 43A: 30 - - 59.
3.	Tile M. Fractures of pelvis and acetabulum. Baltimore; Williams & Wilkins. 1984
4.	Letournel E. Acetabular fractures, classification and management. Clin Orthop 1980; 151: 81–106.
5.	Pennal GF, Davidson J, Garside H, Lewis J. Results of treatment of acetabular fractures. Clin Orthop 1980; 151: 115 - 123.
6.	Tile M, Schatzker J. Rationale of operative fracture care. Berlin, Heidelberg, New York; Springer -Verlag. 1987.
