= Cuneiform fracture =

Foot bone fracture type

- Other names: Medial Cuneiform Fracture, Intermediate Cuneiform Fracture, Lateral Cuneiform Fracture, Isolated Cuneiform Fracture, Cuneiform Dislocation, Isolated medial cuneiform fracture, Cuneiform Stress Fracture
- An X-ray of a Medial cuneiform fracture
- Specialty: Orthopedics

A Cuneiform fracture is an injury of the foot in which one or more of the Cuneiform bones are fractured. The annual incidence of cuboid fracture is 1.8 injuries per 100,000 population.

== Signs and symptoms ==
People who have suffered acute fractures to one or more cuneiform bones typically have excruciating pain over their dorsal or dorsomedial foot. They also have trouble walking on their toes and bearing weight. Usually, there is a region of localized ecchymosis, tenderness, and swelling between the Lisfranc and Chopart joints.

== Causes ==
While cuneiform fractures are fairly rare, the most commonly fractured cuneiform bone is the Medial cuneiform, typically the cause of a cuneiform fracture is by physical trauma (direct blow) to the cuneiform, as well as the result of an avulsion fracture and a result of axial load, but can also be the result of a stress reaction that progressed with continued weight-bearing and physical activity.

== Diagnosis ==
Cuneiform fractures can be very difficult to diagnose because of the complex overlapping articulations of the midfoot, which can make them invisible on plain films. Therefore, identification might need for more sophisticated imaging, like CT or MRI.

== Treatment ==
A cautious reduction is necessary for dislocated cuneiform bones, regardless of the best time to begin therapy.

The right kind of internal fixation needs to be selected after a dislocation has been reduced. When it comes to treating fractures, casting seems to work best for nondisplaced fractures, and open reduction and internal fixation with screws seems to work best for displaced fractures. K-wires can be used to temporarily transfix isolated dislocations and fracture dislocations; these wires are usually removed after six weeks.

== See also ==
- Lisfranc injury
- March fracture
