= Holstein–Lewis fracture =

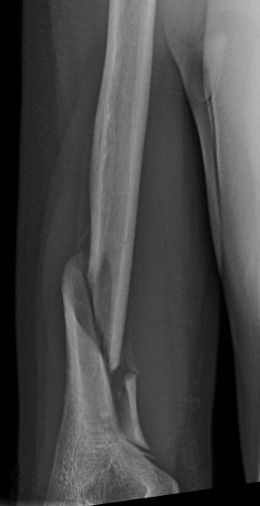
- Holstein–Lewis fracture at 5 weeks post fracture
- Specialty: Orthopedic

A Holstein–Lewis fracture is a fracture of the distal third of the humerus resulting in entrapment of the radial nerve.

== Anatomy and pathology ==
The radial nerve is one of the major nerves of the upper limb. It innervates all of the muscles in the extensor compartments of the arm. Injury to the nerve can therefore result in significant functional deficit for the individual. It is vulnerable to injury with fractures of the humeral shaft as it lies in very close proximity to the bone (it descends within the spiral groove on the posterior aspect of the humerus). Characteristic findings following injury will be as a result of radial nerve palsy (e.g. weakness of wrist/finger extension and sensory loss over the dorsum of the hand).

The vast majority of radial nerve palsies occurring as a result of humeral shaft fractures are neurapraxias (nerve conduction block as a result of traction or compression of the nerve), these nerve palsies can be expected to recover over a period of months. A minority of palsies occur as a result of more significant axonotmeses (division of the axon but preservation of the nerve sheath) or the even more severe neurotmeses (division of the entire nerve structure). As a result, it is important for individuals sustaining a Holstein–Lewis injury to be carefully followed up if there is no evidence of return of function to the arm after approximately three months, further investigations and possibly, nerve exploration or repair may be required. The exception to this rule is if the fracture to the humerus requires fixing in the first instance. In that case, the nerve should be explored at the same time that fixation is performed.

== Eponym ==
It is named for Arthur Holstein (1913–2000) and Gwilym Lewis (1914–2009), American orthopedic surgeons who described it in 1963.
