= Clay-shoveler fracture =

- C7 spinous process.
- Specialty: Neurosurgery

Clay-shoveler's fracture is a stable fracture through the spinous process of a vertebra occurring at any of the lower cervical or upper thoracic vertebrae, classically at C6 or C7. In Australia in the 1930s, men digging deep ditches tossed clay 10 to 15 feet above their heads using long handled shovels. Instead of separating, the sticky clay would sometimes stick to the shovel. At the top of the arc of motion, with the arms extended, the worker may hear a pop and feel a sudden pain between the shoulder blades, unable to continue working.
