= March fracture =

Fracture of the metatarsal bones of the foot due to recurrent stress

- Other names: Fatigue fracture or Stress fracture of metatarsal bone
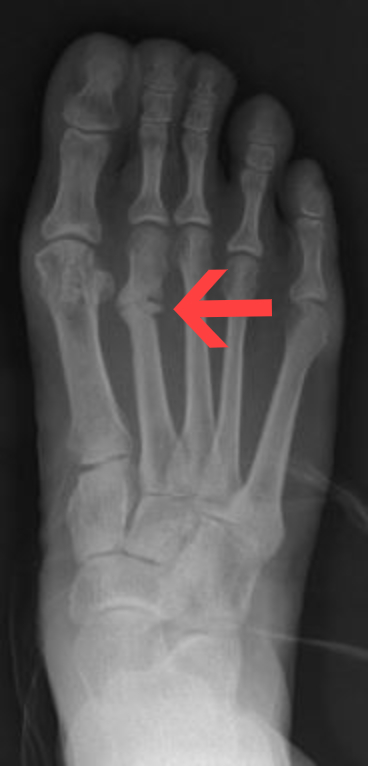
- Stress fracture of the second metatarsal bone
- Specialty: Orthopedics

March fracture is the fracture of the distal third of one of the metatarsal bones occurring because of recurrent stress. It is more common in soldiers, but also occurs in hikers, organists, and other people whose duties entail much standing (such as hospital doctors). March fractures most commonly occur in the second and third metatarsal bones of the foot. It is a common cause of foot pain, especially in those who suddenly increase their activities.

== Signs and symptoms ==
The onset is not dramatic. When the boot or shoe is taken off, there is a cramp-like pain in the affected forefoot, and moderate local edema appears on the dorsal aspect. When each toe is moved in turn, that of the involved metatarsal causes pain, and when the bone is palpated from the dorsal surface, a point of tenderness is found directly over the lesion. Radiography at this stage is negative, but the condition is diagnosed correctly by military surgeons without the aid of x-rays. In civil life, it is seldom diagnosed correctly for a week or two, when, because of lack of immobilization, there is an excessive deposit of callus (which may be palpable) around the fracture.

== Diagnosis ==
X-ray is seldom helpful, but a CT scan and an MRI study may help in diagnosis. Bone scans are positive early on. Dual energy X-ray absorptiometry is also helpful to rule out comorbid osteoporosis.

=== Differential diagnosis ===
- Acute metatarsal fracture
- Hallux rigidus
- Jones fracture
- Sesamoid stress fracture
- Acute sesamoid fracture
- Proximal fifth metatarsal avulsion fracture

== Treatment ==
The first line treatment should be reduction of movements for 6 to 12 weeks. Wooden-soled shoes or a cast should be given for this purpose. In rare cases in which stress fracture occurs with a cavus foot, plantar fascia release may be appropriate.

== Occurrence ==
Stress fractures can occur at many sites in the body; "march fracture" simply refers to a stress fracture specifically of the metatarsals, so named because the injury is sometimes sustained by soldiers during sustained periods of marching. Although march fractures can occur to the 5th metatarsal, fractures of this bone are more likely to be trauma-related fractures to the diaphysis, termed Jones fractures. In runners, march fracture occurs most often in the metatarsal neck, while in dancers it occurs in the proximal shaft. In ballet dancers, fracture mostly occurs at the base of the second metatarsal and at Lisfranc joints. This fracture always occurs following a prolonged stress or weight bearing, and the history of direct trauma is very rare. Consideration should always be given to osteoporosis and osteomalacia. Cavus feet are a risk factor for march fracture.
