= Winquist and Hansen classification =

The Winquist and Hansen classification is a system of categorizing femoral shaft fractures based upon the degree of comminution.

== Classification ==
Type	Description
I	Transverse or short oblique fractures with no comminution or a small butterfly fragment of less than 25% of width of the bone
II	Comminuted with a butterfly fragment of 50% or less of the width of the bone
III	Comminuted with a large butterfly fragment of greater than 50% of the width of bone
IV	Segmental comminution
