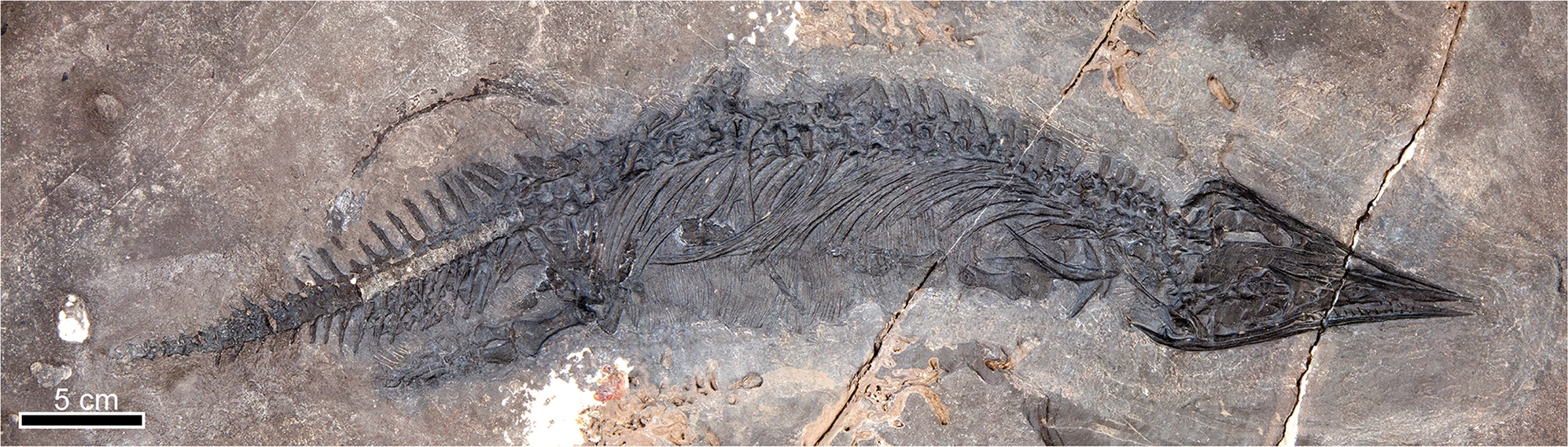
- Articulated skeleton

Scientific classification
- Kingdom: Animalia
- Phylum: Chordata
- Class: Reptilia
- Order: †Thalattosauria
- Superfamily: †Thalattosauroidea
- Genus: †Gunakadeit; Druckenmiller et al., 2020

Type species
- †Gunakadeit joseeae Druckenmiller et al., 2020

= Gunakadeit =

Gunakadeit Temporal range: Late Triassic, 220–215 Ma

Extinct genus of reptiles

Gunakadeit is an extinct genus of thalattosaur. It is known from a single species, Gunakadeit joseeae, which is based on an articulated and mostly complete skeleton from the late Triassic (middle Norian) Hound Island Volcanics of Alaska. Gunakadeit possessed a variety of features from the two major suborders of thalattosaurs, Askeptosauroidea and Thalattosauroidea, and it is considered the most basal member of the latter group. Despite this, it is also the youngest known thalattosaur genus, with the group going extinct at the end of the Triassic. Gunakadeit's basal position and relatively recent occurrence implies a 20-million-year ghost lineage connecting it to the rest of Thalattosauria. The skull ends in a sharply pointed and toothless tip like the askeptosauroid Endennasaurus, but unlike Endennasaurus, Gunakadeit had poorly developed joints and was likely exclusively aquatic in behavior.

== Discovery ==
The holotype, UAMES 23258, was discovered by rare chance. It was discovered within the intertidal zone off the coast of the Keku Islands, which is only exposed for a few days a year. On May 18, 2011, Jim Baichtal discovered a fossil poking out of the rock and he sent a picture to professional palaeontologist Patrick Druckenmiller. During June 2011, when low tides of under four feet were predicted again, the fossil was excavated.

The descriptors chose to honour the Native American Tlingit culture in the name of the new thalattosaur. The genus name Gunakadeit is a Tlingit word, referring to a sea monster in Tlingit mythology whose skin was worn by a young man to provide food to his village. The epithet, joseeae, honours Gene Primaky's mother, Joseé Michelle DeWaelheyns. Primaky helped to excavate the holotype.

== Description ==
=== Skull ===
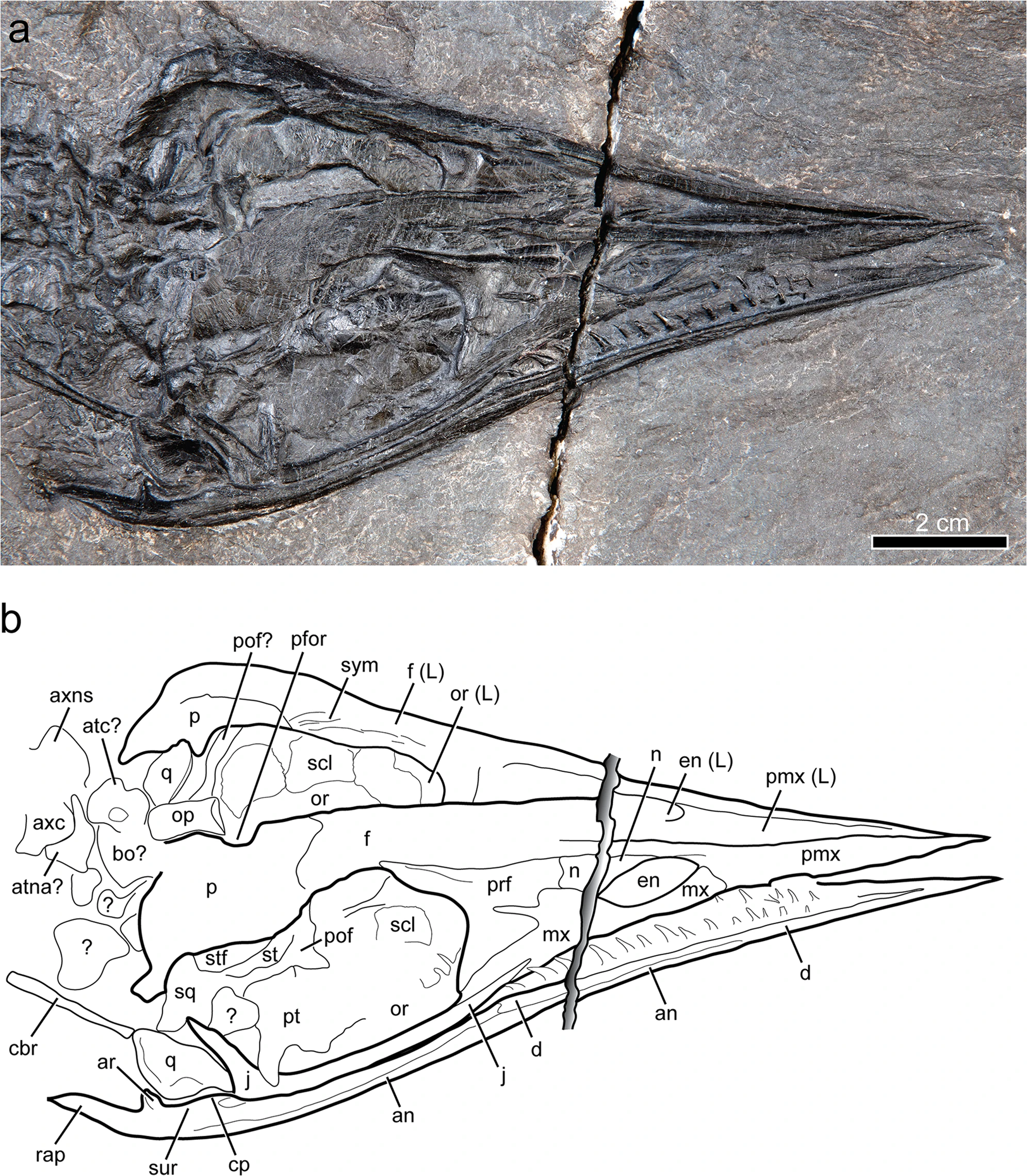
Skull

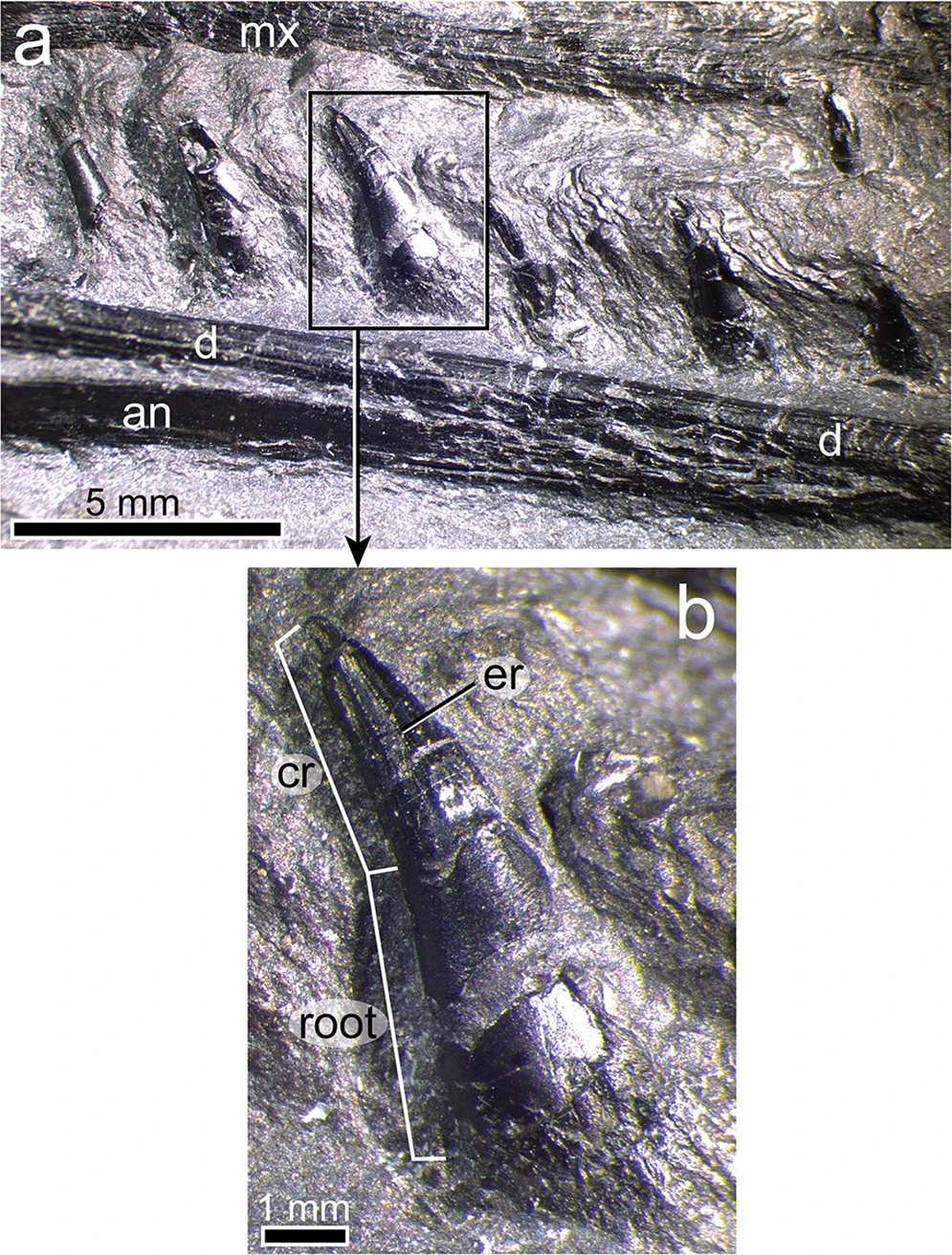
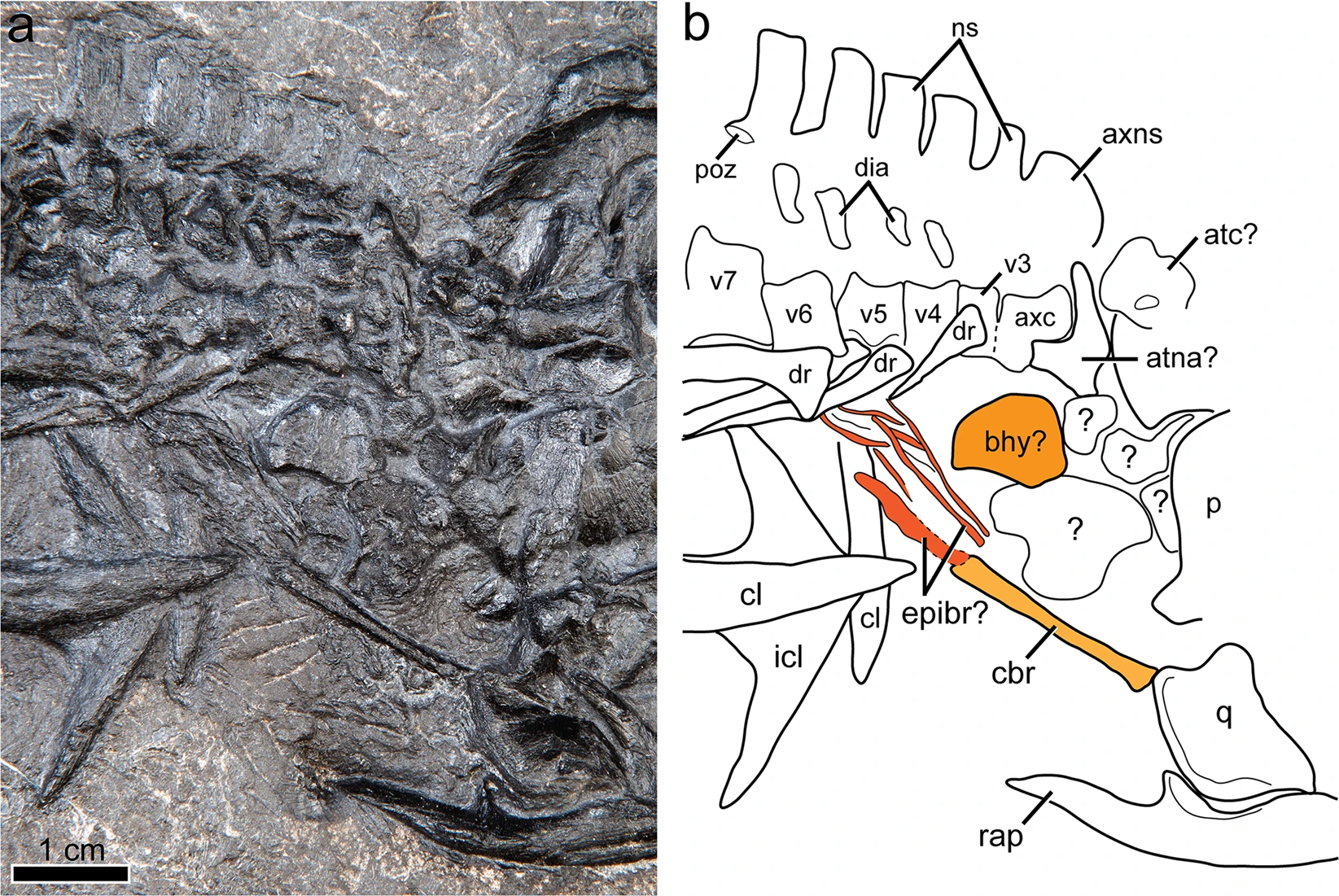
Magnification of Gunakadeit's teeth (left) and neck region with hyoid bones (right)

The skull had a straight snout which ended in a sharply pointed tip somewhat reminiscent of the askeptosauroid Endennasaurus. It is unclear how many teeth were present in the upper jaw, but at least a few have been preserved. The nares were larger in Gunakadeit than in askeptosauroids, and were bound by the maxilla from below and premaxilla and nasal from above. The orbits were also very large; Guanakadeit is the only thalattosaur with orbits significantly larger than the portion of the skull behind them. The jugal is thin and has a unique shape in Gunakadeit compared to other thalattosaurs. It has an elongated forward branch which forms the entire lower edge of the orbit, an upper branch which slopes backwards rather than straight up, and a very short or absent rear branch. Gunakadeit also possesses a small and narrow supratemporal fenestra, which separates the wide parietal bone from the elongated supratemporal bone.

The front of the lower jaw is straight and toothless, with both sides fused together into an extensive and pointed symphysis. The rear of the jaw has a low and thick coronoid process and ends in an elongated, upturned retroarticular process. The lower jaw preserves many similar teeth with sharp, conical crowns. The teeth had long and flattened roots attached to the jaw bone via loose pleurodont implantation. Gunakadeit also has one of the most well-preserved hyoid apparatus known in thalattosaurs. The hyoid (as preserved) consists of a large rod, the ceratobranchial, which is lies adjacent to a large plate (the basihyoid) and is followed by several smaller and thinner rods (epibranchials).

=== Postcrania ===
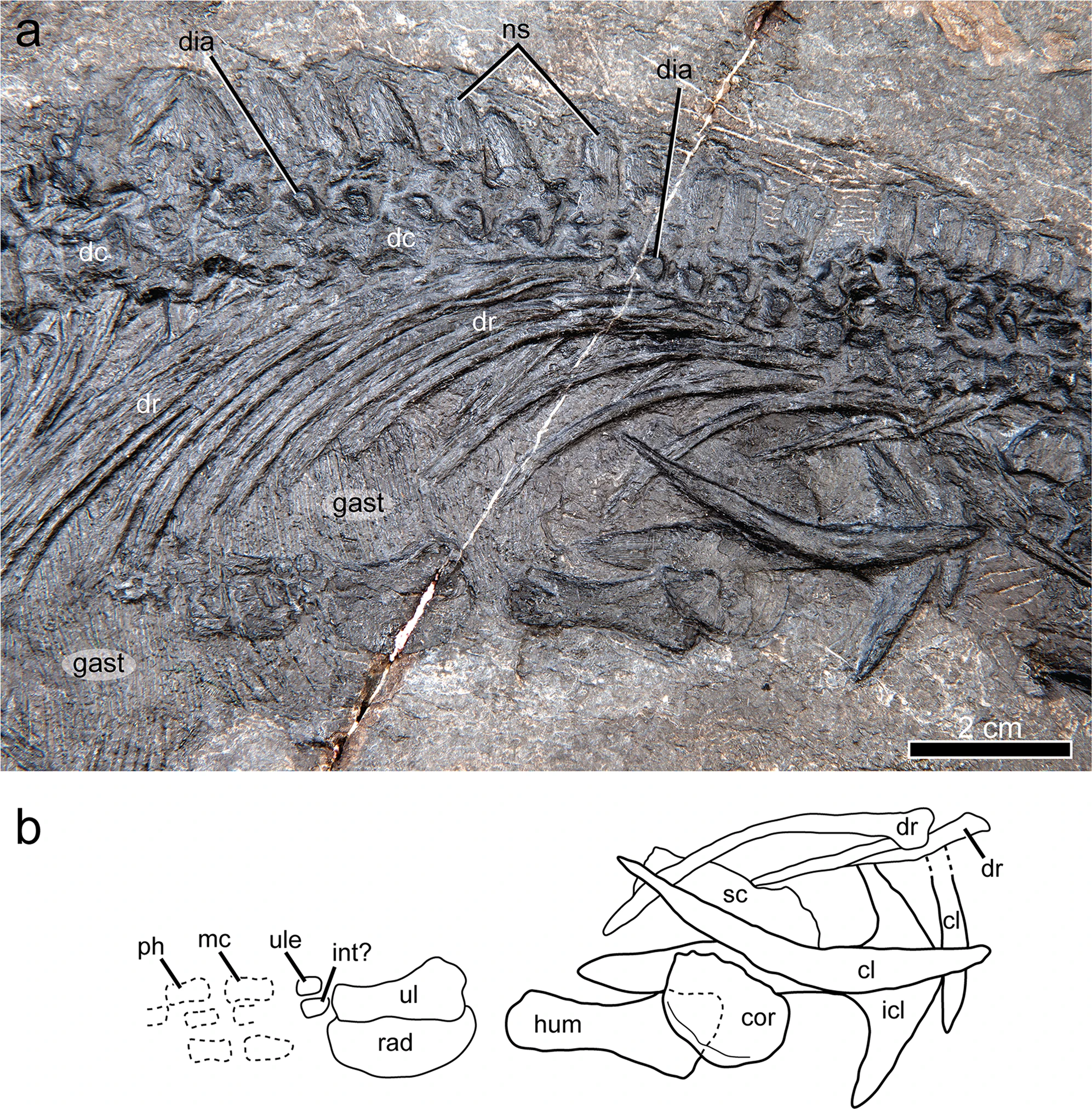
Front of the skeleton, showing forelimbs and shoulder girdle

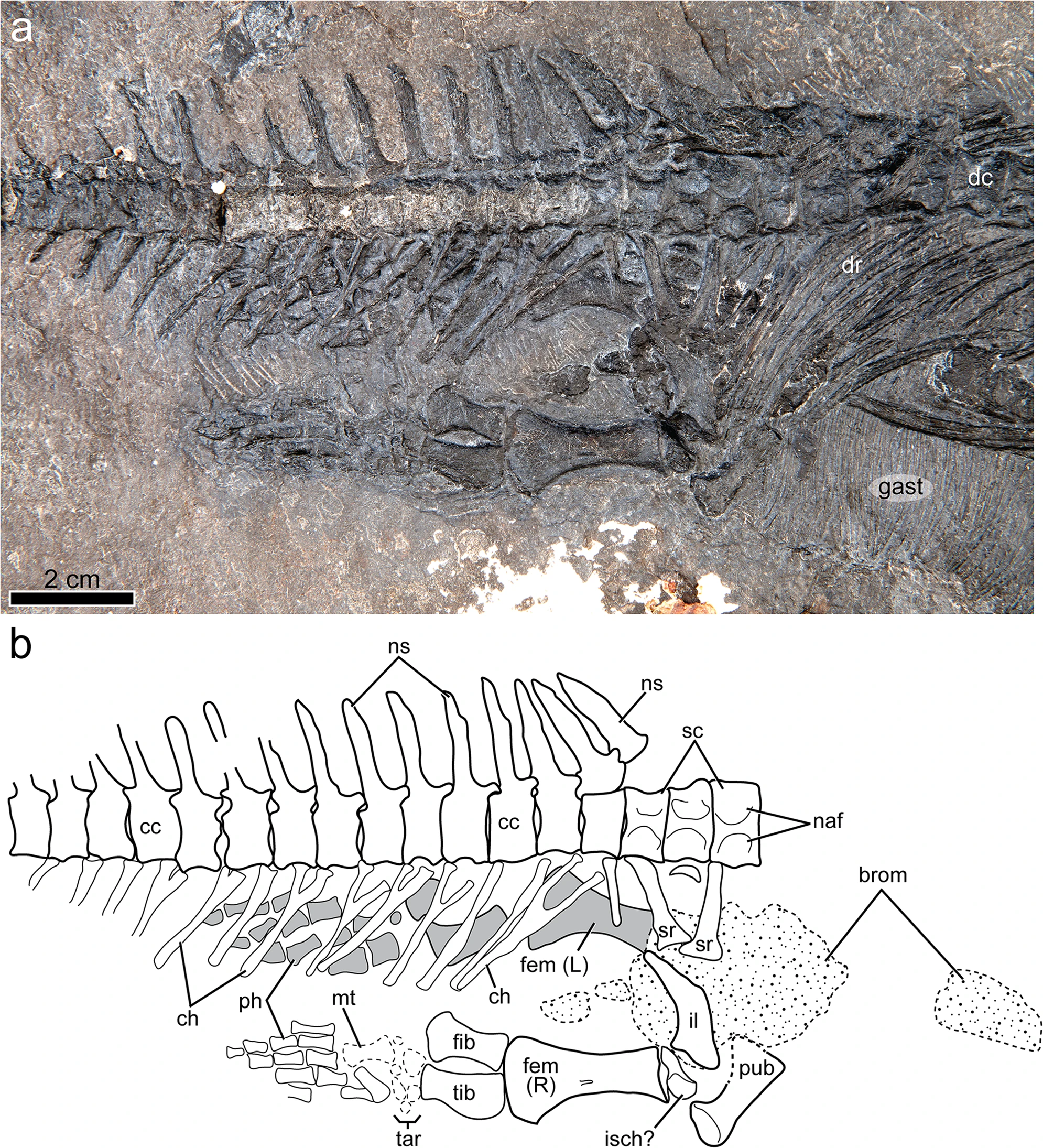
Rear of the skeleton, showing hindlimbs, hip, and tail

The neck is very short, formed by only four cervical vertebrae. The 28 dorsal vertebrae have tall neural spines, which become pointed and bent backwards closer to the hip. There were three sacral vertebrae, although these were similar to the dorsals and had unusually thin sacral ribs. Caudals (tail vertebrae) had narrow and fairly elongated chevrons and neural spines at the base of the tail, which diminished in size further down the tail. The tip of the holotype's tail is missing, so Gunakadeit had more caudals than the 23 preserved in the skeleton. Ribs were single-headed and weakly curved, overlying several sets of extremely thin and numerous gastralia.

The interclavicle had uniquely extensive lateral processes (side branches), which connected to very long and robust clavicles. The scapula and coracoid were smaller and less unusual in their proportions. The humerus was simple and flattened. Its widest point was near the shoulder, unlike askeptosauroids. The radius is thick and curved, though not as short as the similarly-shaped radius of Xinpusaurus. It was slightly shorter than the humerus and similar in length to the robust, tapering ulna. The wrist and hand are poorly preserved, but there appears to be at least two carpals and four fingers.

The posterodorsal process (upper rear branch) of the ilium tapers to a point, a shape otherwise unknown in thalattosaurs. A bone tentatively identified as the pubis is large, wide, and lacks an obturator foramen (a hole present in other thalattosaur hips). The femur is fairly simple and widens towards the knee. The fibula is very short, as is the tibia which has a uniquely convex inner edge. At least six tarsals and five toes were present, although most bones of the foot are poorly preserved.

== Classification ==
A phylogenetic analysis found Gunakadeit to be the most basal member of Thalattosauroidea, a suborder of the marine reptile order Thalattosauria. Its placement within Thalattosauroidea is supported by various aspects of the postcrania, such as the shape of the radius, femur, and tail vertebrae. However, it also retained several askeptosauroid-like features of the skull such as a low coronoid process and a straight, pointed jaw without much variation in tooth shape. These traits are likely to be plesiomorphic ("primitive") for thalattosaurs as a whole, so they are more likely to signify that Gunakadeit was a basal thalattosauroid rather than an askeptosauroid. The following cladogram illustrates the result of the analysis, after the exclusion of several unstable and fragmentary thalattosaurs (Agkistrognathus and several unnamed taxa represented by specimens TMP 88.99.21 and SMNS 90568):

- Thalattosauria
  - Askeptosauroidea
    - Askeptosaurus
    - - Endennasaurus
      - - Anshunsaurus huangnihensis
        - - Anshunsaurus huangguoshuensis
          - Anshunsaurus wushaensis
          - Miodentosaurus
  - Thalattosauroidea
    - Gunakadeit
    - - Thalattosaurus
      - - Nectosaurus
        - - - Paralonectes
            - - Concavispina
              - Xinpusaurus
          - - Clarazia
            - Hescheleria
