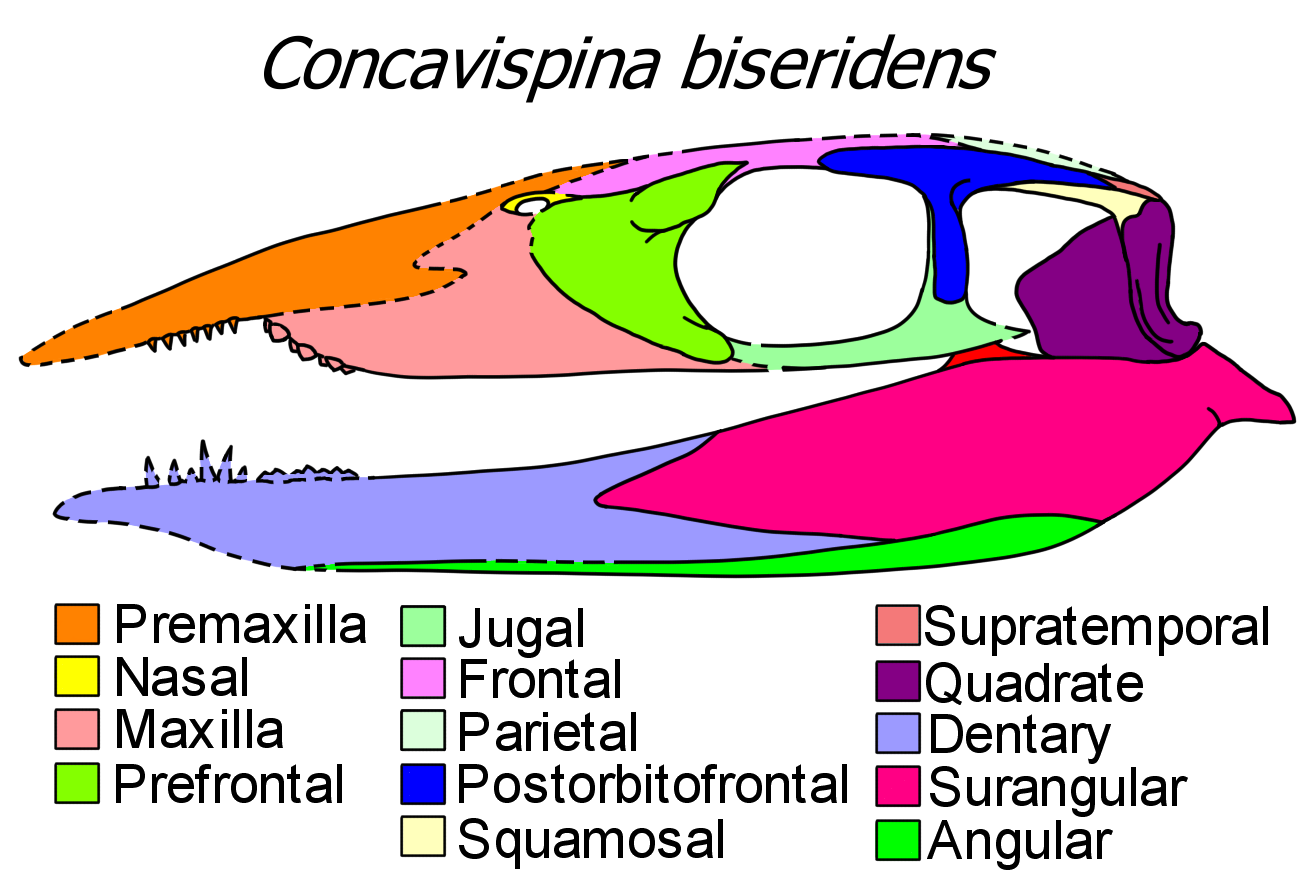
- A diagram of the skull

Scientific classification
- Kingdom: Animalia
- Phylum: Chordata
- Class: Reptilia
- Order: †Thalattosauria
- Superfamily: †Thalattosauroidea
- Genus: †Concavispina; Zhao et al., 2013

Type species
- †Concavispina biseridens Zhao et al., 2013

= Concavispina =

Concavispina Temporal range: Late Triassic, 237–228 Ma

Extinct genus of reptiles

Concavispina is an extinct genus of thalattosaur reptile from the early Late Triassic (Carnian stage) Xiaowa Formation of Guangling, Guizhou, southern China. It contains a single species, Concavispina biseridens. It is known only from the holotype ZMNH M8804, a nearly complete 364 cm long skeleton. Concavispina can be differentiated from other thalattosaurs by possessing two rows of blunt teeth on the anterior part of the maxilla (upper jaw bone) and a V-shaped notch on the dorsal margin of each neural spine in the dorsal (back) vertebrae. Both its generic and specific names refer to these autapomorphies (unique characteristics), as Concavispina means "concave spine" and biseridens means "two rows of teeth". It is thought to be most closely related to Xinpusaurus, as both taxa share three derived characters: a maxilla that is curved upward at its anterior end, a humerus (upper arm bone) that is wider near the shoulder than near the elbow, and the presence of less than five cervicals (neck vertebrae).

== Description ==
Concavispina has a large skull, short neck, short limbs, and long tail. ZMNH M8804 is 364 centimetres (11.94 ft) long, making Concavispina biseridens the second longest thalattosaur after Miodentosaurus brevis. It has the largest skull of any thalattosaur. The skull is 50 centimetres (20 in) long and about half the length of the torso. Concavispina has less than five cervical vertebrae and its pectoral girdle is very close to its skull. 114 caudal or tail vertebrae are present, although the tip of the tail is not preserved. The tail makes up most of the length of the body. It is laterally compressed due to the long neural spines and chevrons that extend from each vertebra. The radius, ulna, fibula and tibia (the bones which make up the lower forelimb and lower hindlimb, respectively) are very short and very wide compared to the humerus and femur (which make up the upper forelimb and upper hindlimb). The carpal (wrist) and tarsal (ankle) bones are weakly developed.

== Paleobiology ==
Like all thalattosaurs, Concavispina was a marine reptile that probably swam by lateral undulation or side-to-side movement of its elongated body. The limbs are too short to have provided much propulsive power. Concavispina was probably not as strong a swimmer as its closest relative Xinpusaurus because it has shorter neural spines with V-shaped notches, which would have reduced the surface area over which the M. semispinalis muscle (the main muscle along the top of the tail in most reptiles) could anchor. The tail is also less tall in Concavispina than in Xinpusaurus.

Although Concavispina and Xinpusaurus both had pointed teeth at the front of the jaw and blunter teeth towards the front, Xinpusaurus's teeth were larger and more robust in general. This may support the hypothesis that Concavispina fed on relatively soft-bodied animals such as fish and jellyfish, while Xinpusaurus may have fed on harder prey with shells. However, Concavispina's maxillary teeth are wider than they are tall, proportionally similar to teeth of marine predators in the "crushing" guild (such as Globidens and modern walruses), which specialize in thick-shelled animals like molluscs. Xinpusaurus's teeth are generally taller than wide, similar to "crunching" guild marine predators (such as thalattosuchians and some large ichthyosaurs) which preferred armored crustaceans and fish but were not too specialized to avoid softer prey.

The Xiaowa Formation is a Lagerstätte from which hundreds of fossils of thalattosaurs and crinoid invertebrates. Concavispina biseridens lived alongside many other species of thalattosaurs, including Anshunsaurus huangguoshuensis, Miodentosaurus brevis, Xinpusaurus suni, Xinpusaurus bamaolinensis, and Xinpusaurus kohi, making the thalattosaur fauna of the Xiaowa Formation the most diverse in the world.

== Relationships ==
A phylogenetic analysis of Concavispina in 2013 produced the following result, with Xinpusaurus as its closest relative within the clade Thalattosauroidea:

- Diapsida
  - Petrolacosaurus kansensis
  - - Youngina capensis
    - - Prolacerta broomi
      - Thalattosauria
        - Askeptosauroidea
          - Miodentosaurus brevis
          - - Endennasaurus acutirostris
            - - Anshunsaurus huangguoshuensis
              - Anshunsaurus wushaensis
              - Askeptosaurus italicus
        - Thalattosauroidea
          - Paralonectes merriami
          - - - Concavispina biseridens
              - Xinpusaurus suni
            - - Clarazia schinzi
              - - Hescheleria ruebeli
                - - - Agkistrognathus campebelli
                    - Nectosaurus halius
                  - - Thalattosaurus alexandrae
                    - Thalattosaurus borealis
