= Xinpusaurus =

Xinpusaurus Temporal range: Carnian, 232–228 Ma
- Skeletal mount of X. suni, National Natural History Museum of China

Scientific classification
- Kingdom: Animalia
- Phylum: Chordata
- Class: Reptilia
- Order: †Thalattosauria
- Superfamily: †Thalattosauroidea
- Genus: †Xinpusaurus; Yin, 2000

Species
- †X. suni Yin, 2000 (type); †X. bamaolinensis Cheng, 2003; †X. kohi Jiang et al., 2004; †X. xingyiensis Li et al., 2016

Extinct genus of reptiles

Xinpusaurus is an extinct genus of thalattosaur from the Late Triassic of Guanling in Guizhou, China. Several species have been named since 2000: the type species X. suni along with the species X. bamaolinensis and X. kohi. A 2013 study proposed that all three species are synonymous with each other, in which case X. suni would be the only valid species, although a 2014 study argued that X. kohi was also valid. A fourth species, X. xingyiensis, was described in 2016.

== Description ==
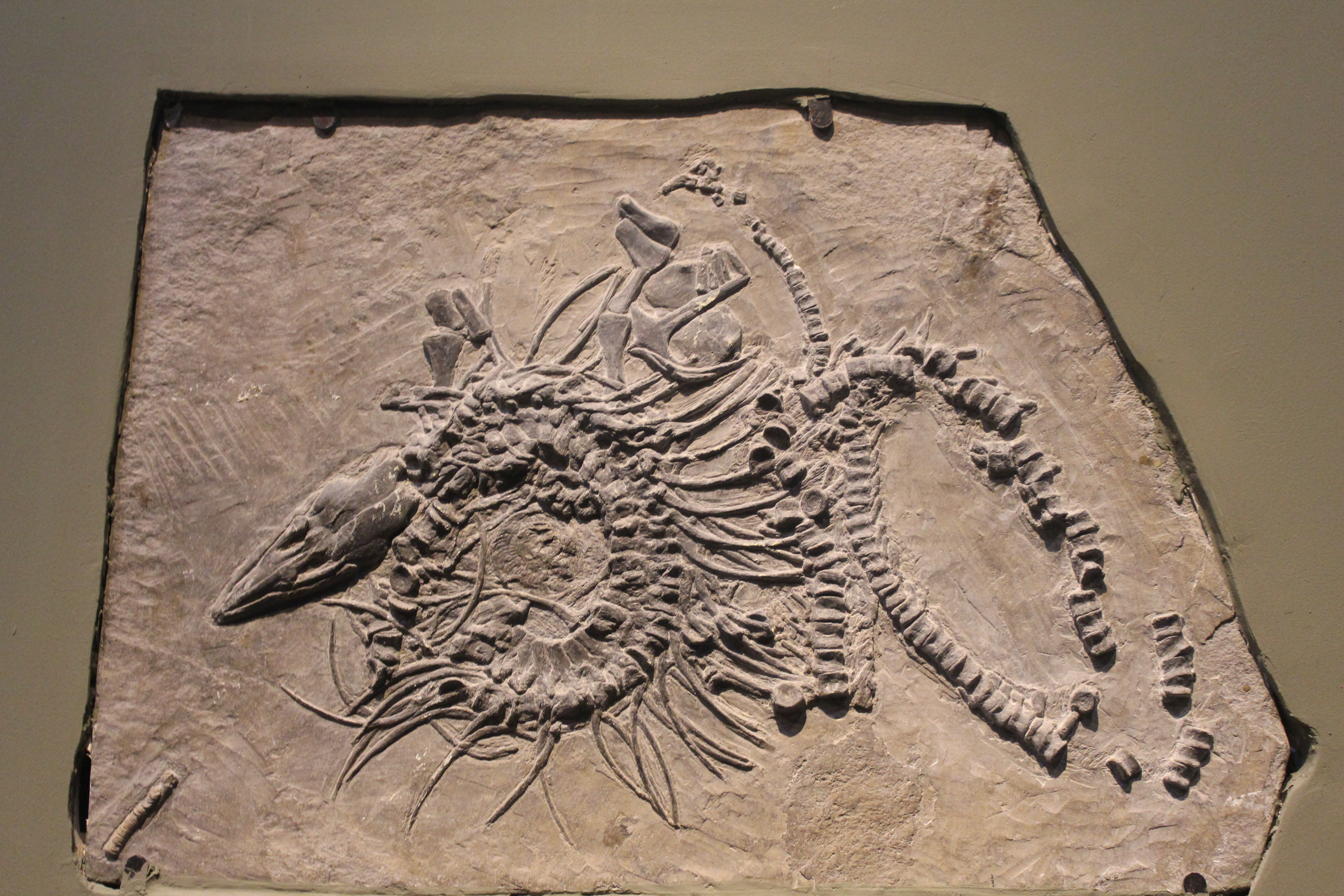
Fossil skeleton, Tianjin Natural History Museum

Xinpusaurus is a thalattosaur, a group of triassic marine reptiles with long, paddle-like tails and short legs with independently movable digits. Specifically, it is a member of the group thalattosauroidea, which are characterized by their downturned premaxillae. Xinpusaurus had a short neck, a massive quadrate, and one of the few braincases preserved in thalattosaurs. The lower jaws of this genus show two different forms of dentary-surangular sutures, either a v-shaped suture with the surangular cutting into the dentary from the side (type 1) or an oblique suture with the surangular underlying the dentary (type 2). X. bamaolinensis preserves a type 2 suture while X. kohi has a type 1 suture. X. suni's suture differs between specimens while X. xingyiensis seems to have a type 2 suture. The dentary is also narrow and shorter than the snout, with robust, pointed teeth in the front of its jaws and broad crushing teeth in the back of its jaws, suggesting that it fed on hard-shelled prey, although these adaptations are not as extreme as those of Concavispina, which had exclusively short and blunt teeth. This genus also has a uniquely upward-curving maxilla, a wide proximal end of the humerus, and a radius with a convex lateral edge and concave medial edge.

X. bamaolinensis and X. kohi had particularly elongated premaxillae, forming a narrow and pointed rostrum. However, the specimens with the longest snouts are also the smallest in other proportions, so this may be a juvenile trait and cannot be used to distinguish these species from X. suni.

X. xingyiensis is the largest species known and is also probably the least advanced, as it does not have a posterior process of the jugal unlike the other species and shares some similarities with the genus Concavispina.

== History ==
Xinpusaurus suni was first described by Yin et al. in 2000 based on four specimens: Gmr 010, 011, 012, and 013, with only Gmr 010 (the holotype) receiving an informal description. Other specimens of this species have been found from 2001 to 2002 including GGSr 001 (a well-preserved skull and partial skeleton) IVPP V 11860 (an isolated skull), IVPP V 12673 (a partial skeleton), and IVPP V 14372 (an isolated skull). IVPP V 12673 is the only well described specimen.

Xinpusaurus bamaolinensis was described in 2003 from SPCV 30015, a complete skeleton with a well-preserved skull and jaws found in two isolated slabs. These slabs may not represent the same individual, in which case only the front slab can be safely assigned to the genus. Inconsistencies within its description (such as reporting a quadratojugal, a feature unknown in thalattosaurs) have led to some confusion over its diagnosis, and a redescription would be necessary to resolve these issues and determine if it is a valid species or not.

Xinpusaurus kohi was described in 2004 from GMPKU 2000/05, an incomplete skeleton. This specimen was also found in two slabs, with the rear slab missing most of the hindlimbs and possibly not belonging to the same individual as the first. In addition, there is evidence that some of the bone structure near the break has been tampered with and that most of the pelvic material has been lost. A 2013 analysis showed that many of the traits initially believed to differentiate X. kohi from X. suni were inaccurate, either due to incomplete data, misidentification, or poor preservation. However, a redescription in 2014 resurrected the legitimacy of the species. This redescription provided additional diagnostic features and argued that the alterations were relatively minimal and that the posterior slab was almost certainly from the same individual as the anterior one.

Xinpusaurus xingyiensis was described in 2016 from XNGM WS-53-R3, a nearly complete articulated skeleton from the Zhuganpo member of the Falang formation.

== Relationships ==
A phylogenetic analysis of thalattosaurs published in 2013 found Concavispina to be the closest relative of Xinpusaurus. Below is a cladogram based on that analysis:

- Diapsida
  - Petrolacosaurus kansensis
  - - Youngina capensis
    - - Prolacerta broomi
      - Thalattosauria
        - Askeptosauroidea
          - Miodentosaurus brevis
          - - Endennasaurus acutirostris
            - - Anshunsaurus huangguoshuensis
              - Anshunsaurus wushaensis
              - Askeptosaurus italicus
        - Thalattosauroidea
          - Paralonectes merriami
          - - - Concavispina biseridens
              - Xinpusaurus suni
            - - Clarazia schinzi
              - - Hescheleria ruebeli
                - - - Agkistrognathus campbelli
                    - Nectosaurus halius
                  - - Thalattosaurus alexandrae
                    - Thalattosaurus borealis
