= Paralonectes =

Paralonectes Temporal range: Early to Middle Triassic

Scientific classification
- Kingdom: Animalia
- Phylum: Chordata
- Class: Reptilia
- Order: †Thalattosauria
- Family: †Thalattosauridae
- Genus: †Paralonectes; Nichols & Brinkman, 1993

Type species
- Paralonectes merriami Nichols & Brinkman, 1993

Extinct genus of reptiles

Paralonectes is an extinct genus of thalattosaurian reptile which lived in the Early or Middle Triassic of what is today British Columbia. The type and only species is P. merriami. The genus name is derived from Ancient Greek and means "shore swimmer", and the species epithet is in honor of J. C. Merriam, a paleontologist who has done extensive work on Triassic marine reptiles.

== Discovery and description ==
Paralonectes was described in 1993 in the same publication that described the sympatric species Thalattosaurus borealis and Agkistrognathus campbelli. All three taxa were discovered in the rocks of the Sulphur Mountain Formation. All known specimens of Paralonectes were transported to and prepared at the Royal Tyrrell Museum of Paleontology. The holotype includes a mostly complete skull with an associated mandible, several vertebrae, ribs, an ischium, and a few limb bones, and it was given the designation TMP 89.127.1. Two referred specimens (TMP 89.127.2 and TMP 91.120.21) include several additional isolated skull elements.

== Classification ==
The classification of Thalattosauria has been controversial, and it is not known with confidence to which other reptiles they are closely related. They have been suggested to be relatives of Sauropterygia, Archosauromorpha, or possibly being part of a more primitive lineage. A cladogram summarizing the internal interrelationships of thalattosaurs is shown below.

- Thalattosauriformes
  - Askeptosauroidea
    - Endennasaurus
    - Askeptosauridae
      - Anshunsaurus
      - Askeptosaurus
  - Thalattosauria
    - - Nectosaurus
      - Xinpusaurus
    - Thalattosauridae
      - Agkistrognathus
      - - Paralonectes
        - - Thalattosaurus
          - - Clarazia
            - Hescheleria
