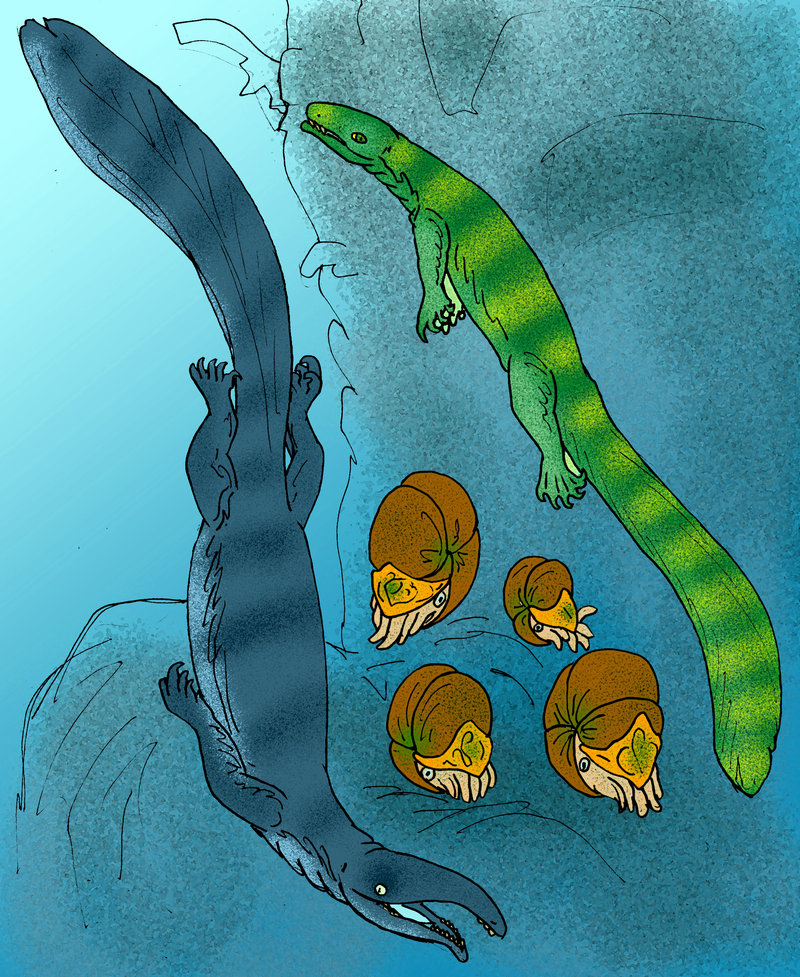
- Life restoration of Nectosaurus halinus (right) and Thalattosaurus alexandrae (left)

Scientific classification
- Kingdom: Animalia
- Phylum: Chordata
- Class: Reptilia
- Order: †Thalattosauria
- Superfamily: †Thalattosauroidea; Merriam, 1904

Subtaxa
- †Agkistrognathus; †Concavispina; †Gunakadeit; †Nectosaurus; †Paralonectes; †Thalattosaurus; †Wapitisaurus; †Xinpusaurus; †Claraziidae; †Clarazia; †Hescheleria

Synonyms
- Thalattosauria Nicholls, 1999

= Thalattosauroidea =

Thalattosauroidea Temporal range: Middle To Late Triassic, 247.2–215 Ma

Extinct superfamily of reptiles

Thalattosauroidea is a superfamily of thalattosaurs, a Triassic group of marine reptiles. It was named in 1904 by paleontologist John Campbell Merriam to include the genus Thalattosaurus from California. Thalattosauroids are one of two groups of Thalattosauria, the other being Askeptosauroidea. Thalattosauroids make up the "traditional" thalattosaurs with large downturned snouts, short necks, and long, paddle-like tails.

== Classification ==
Thalattosauria includes North American genera such as Thalattosaurus and Nectosaurus as well as recently described Chinese forms such as Xinpusaurus. A 1999 study of thalattosaurs, which established much of the currently accepted phylogeny of the group, referred to Thalattosauroidea as Thalattosauria, while calling the larger group Thalattosauriformes. More recent phylogenetic studies have come upon the same conclusions, but refer to the group as Thalattosauroidea in order to contrast it with another superfamily of thalattosaurs, Askeptosauroidea. Below is a cladogram from Wu et al. (2009) showing the phylogenetic relationships of Thalattosauroidea:

- Thalattosauria
  - Askeptosauroidea
  - Thalattosauroidea
    - - Nectosaurus
      - Xinpusaurus
      - Kössen-Form
    - - Agkistrognathus
      - - Paralonectes
        - - Thalattosaurus
          - Claraziidae
            - Clarazia
            - Hescheleria
