= Pachystropheus =

Pachystropheus Temporal range: Rhaetian

Scientific classification
- Kingdom: Animalia
- Phylum: Chordata
- Class: Reptilia
- Order: †Thalattosauria
- Genus: †Pachystropheus von Huene, 1935
- Species: †P. rhaeticus

Binomial name
- †Pachystropheus rhaeticus von Huene, 1935

Extinct genus of reptiles

Pachystropheus (After Greek Pachys, "Thick" and Strophaios, Vertebrae) is a genus of prehistoric thalattosaurian marine reptile, from the Rhaetian (Late Triassic) of southwestern England and southern Germany. It is the youngest known thalattosaur.

== Taxonomy ==
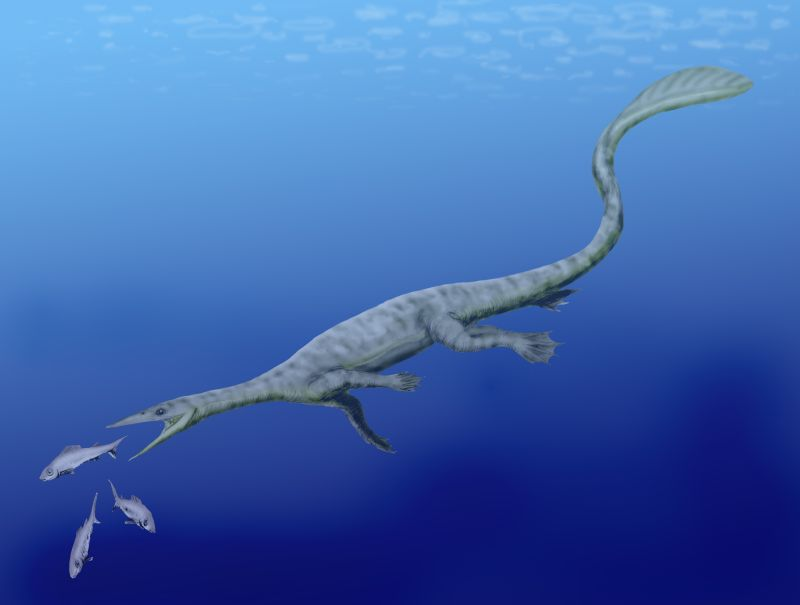
Life restoration of Endennasaurus , thought to be a close relative of Pachystropheus

Pachystropheus was named by Erika von Huene in 1935; Huene described Pachystropheus as a choristodere, but this was overlooked for decades until its redescription by Storrs and Gower in 1993. This reevaluation would extend the fossil record of choristoderes back 45 million years. However, other authors consider attribution of Pachystropheus to Choristodera problematic, stating that it depends on vertebral and girdle characters that are also found in the skeletons of aquatic reptiles other than choristoderes; most of the diagnostic features of choristoderes are skull features, but the presence of these cannot be confirmed in Pachystropheus, as there is no confirmed skull material for this taxon. Silvio Renesto (2005) found similarities in the postcranial skeleton of Pachystropheus and the thalattosaur genus Endennasaurus; according to Renesto, these similarities may indicate that Pachystropheus and Endennasaurus are close relatives, but they might as well simply be a case of a convergent evolution triggered by the aquatic lifestyle of both taxa. The placement as a thalattosaur has been supported by other researchers, including a thorough analysis published in 2024, which found it to be a thalattosaur based on postcranial characters, including the presence of a "finely striated blade of the ilium", and a member of the subclade Askeptosauroidea based on its dumbbell-shaped radius. The phylogenetic analysis recovered it as closely related to Endennasaurus.

In 2026, remains of Pachystropheus were reported from the Rhineland-Palatinate region of Germany.

== Description ==
Pachystropheus reached an estimated maximum total body length of around 2.5 metres (8.2 ft), though most known individuals are much smaller, less than 1 metre (3.3 ft) in length. The ribs of the body display pachyostosis and the vertebrae exhibit thickening, likely as an adaptation to living in a marine environment. As no teeth are known for Pachystropheus, it may have been toothless like its close relative Endennasaurus.

== Ecology ==
The Westbury Mudstone where Pachystropheus was found represents a shallow shelf marine environment. Pachystropheus likely used its limbs as paddles along with propulsion from the tail. It probably fed on small fish and cephalopods. Finds in coprolites suggests that Pachystropheus was fed upon by larger marine reptiles.
