= Druckenmiller =

Druckenmiller is a surname. Notable people with the surname include:

- Jim Druckenmiller (born 1972), American football player
- Patrick Druckenmiller (fl. 2002), American paleontologist
- Stanley Druckenmiller (born 1953), American fund manager
