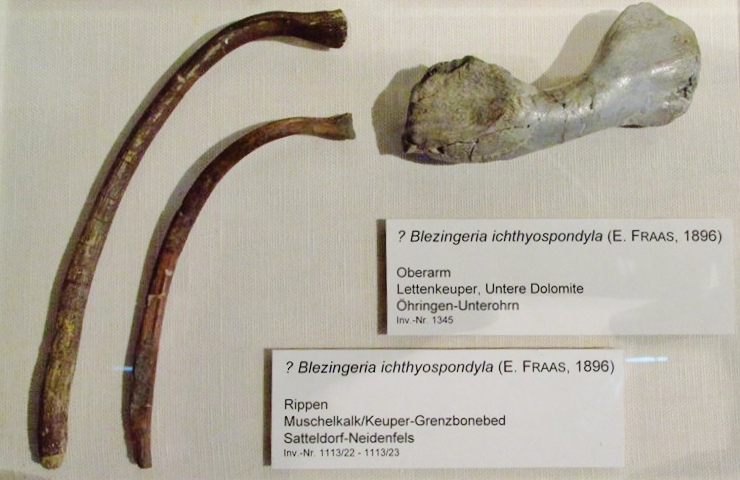
- Fossils

Scientific classification
- Domain: Eukaryota
- Kingdom: Animalia
- Phylum: Chordata
- Class: Reptilia
- Order: †Thalattosauria (?)
- Genus: †Blezingeria; Fraas, 1896

Type species
- †Blezingeria ichthyospondyla Fraas, 1896

= Blezingeria =

Blezingeria Temporal range: Middle Triassic, Ladinian

Extinct genus of reptiles

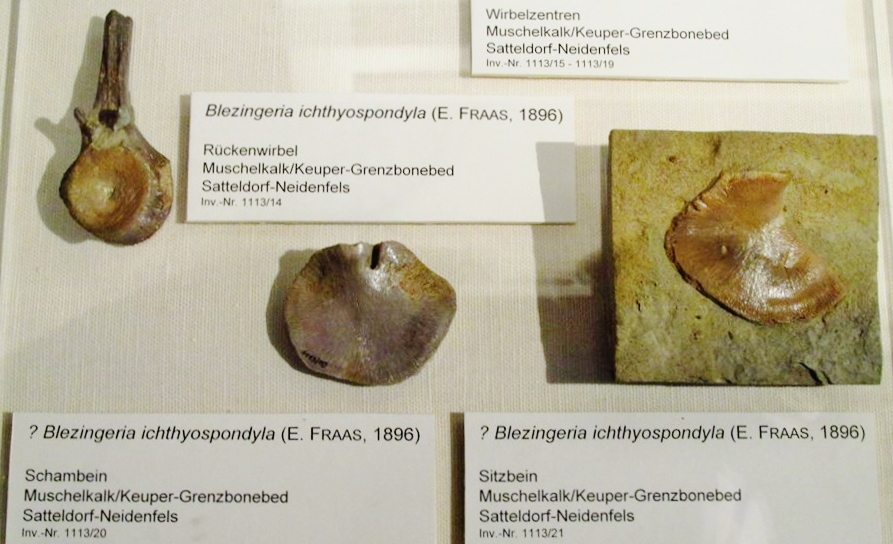
Fossils

Blezingeria is an extinct genus of marine reptile from the Middle Triassic of Germany. The type and only species Blezingeria ichthyospondyla was named by German paleontologist Eberhard Fraas in 1896. It is known from many isolated bones that come from a deposit in southwestern Germany called the Upper Muschelkalk, which dates back to the Ladinian stage. The relationships of Blezingeria are uncertain. Fraas identified it as a nothosaur, but it has also been classified as a cymbospondylid ichthyosaur, and most recently a thalattosaur. Many thalattosaur fossils have been found in a slightly olderLate Ladinian-age rock unit in Monte San Giorgio, Switzerland, so if Blezingeria is a thalattosaur, it may represent an early stage in an evolutionary radiation of the group across the Tethys, an ocean that covered much of what is now Europe and southern China during the Triassic. However, since Blezingeria is known from very incomplete material, its classification as a thalattosaur remains uncertain.
