= Patrick S. Druckenmiller =

American paleontologist

Patrick Druckenmiller
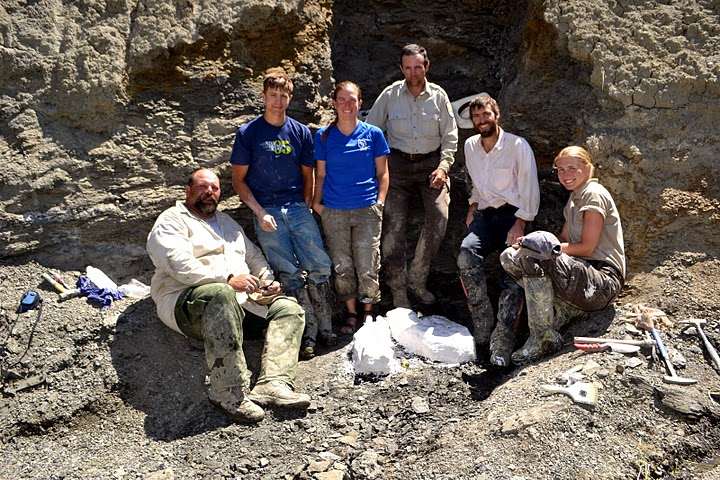
- Druckenmiller on a dig in 2011 (second right)
- Born: Fort Collins, Colorado, U.S.
- Spouse: Lisa Druckenmiller
- Scientific career
- Fields: Paleontology
- Institutions: University of Alaska Museum of the North, Paleo Arctic Research Consortium

Patrick Scott Druckenmiller is a Mesozoic paleontologist, taxonomist, associate professor of geology, Earth Sciences curator, and museum director of the University of Alaska Museum of the North, where he oversees the largest single collection of Alaskan invertebrate and vertebrate fossils. He has published work on plesiosaurs, ichthyosaurs, mastodons, and dinosaurs in the United States, Svalbard, and Canada. He has co-authored papers on discussions of mass extinctions and biogeography. Much of his work has focused on Arctic species. He is a member of the Spitsbergen Jurassic Research group, which focuses on marine reptiles.

== Education ==
Druckenmiller has served as a curator and as a faculty member in the University of Alaska, Fairbanks since 2007. Druckenmiller worked at the Museum of the Rockies in Bozeman, Montana, before coming to Alaska. He holds a Ph.D. from the University of Calgary in Alberta and a master's degree from Montana State University in Bozeman, where he worked under paleontologist Jack Horner.

== Arctic research ==
Much of Druckenmiller's work focuses on cold-hardy, high-latitude prehistoric animals. In 2015, he and his student named a new species of a duck-billed, plant-eating dinosaur, Ugrunaaluk kuukpikensis, that apparently lived in the snowy Arctic year-round. His Arctic research received media attention from National Geographic that wrote about Ugrunaaluk: "The image of tyrannosaurs, horned dinosaurs, and hadrosaurs walking through the cool forests of ancient Alaska has run so counter to the classic Mesozoic imagery that it's not surprising that this environment has been the subject of several recent documentaries and even a feature film."

Druckenmiller has worked extensively on ichnofossils, including fossil track sites in Denali National Park and Svalbard. Druckenmiller started a five-year project in Denali in partnership with the Park Service to investigate the surrounding polar dinosaurs. As part of this project, they found the first fossilized bone in the park.

Druckenmiller has also extensively studied high latitude marine reptiles, describing several new species. These include the thalattosaur Gunakadeit joseeae from the Hound Island Volcanics of Alaska, the plesiosaur Edgarosaurus muddi from the Thermopolis Shale of Montana the plesiosaurs Nichollssaura borealis and Wapuskanectes betsynichollsae and the ichthyosaur Athabascasaurus bitumineus from the Clearwater Formation of Alberta, and the plesiosaurs Ophthalmothule cryostea, Djupedalia engeri, Spitrasaurus larseni, and Spitrasaurus wensaasi, the pliosaur Pliosaurus funkei, and the ichthyosaurs Cryopterygius kristiansenae, Keilhauia nui, and Palvennia hoybergeti from the Agardhfjellet Formation.

Druckenmiller has also contributed to the study of Pleistocene megafauna, having coauthored papers on the lifetime movement patterns of woolly mammoths and of steppe bison, the dietary ecology of wild horses and steppe bison on the mammoth steppe of Alaska, and the changes in geographic distribution of American mastodons in response to climatic oscillations during the Pleistocene.

Druckenmiller's expertise in organizing safe and successful expeditions into the Arctic was the subject of a Nature article, where Druckenmiller credits his expedition success to the good food. "Good food — high quality and in copious amounts — is essential...After 30 field seasons, Druckenmiller needs only a dry tent to be happy. But he keeps a sharp eye out for anyone who might be overwhelmed by miserable conditions."

Below is a list of taxa that Druckenmiller has contributed to naming:

Year	Taxon	Authors
2026	Camurodon borealis gen. et sp. nov.	Shelley, Eberle, Erickson, & Druckenmiller
2026	Kaniqsiqcosmodon polaris gen. et sp. nov.	Shelley, Eberle, Erickson, & Druckenmiller
2026	Qayaqgruk peregrinus gen. et sp. nov.	Shelley, Eberle, Erickson, & Druckenmiller
2023	Sikuomys mikros gen. et sp. nov.	Eberle, Clemens, Erickson, & Druckenmiller
2020	Ophthalmothule cryostea gen. et sp. nov.	Roberts, Druckenmiller, Cordonnier, Delsett, & Hurum
2020	Gunakadeit joseeae gen. et sp. nov.	Druckenmiller, Kelley, Metz, & Baichtal
2019	Unnuakomys hutchisoni gen. et sp. nov.	Eberle, Clemens, McCarthy, Fiorillo, Erickson, & Druckenmiller
2017	Keilhauia nui gen. et sp. nov.	Delsett, Roberts, Druckenmiller, & Hurum
2014	Janusaurus lundi gen. et sp. nov.	Roberts, Druckenmiller, Saetre, & Hurum
2012	Palvennia hoybergeti gen. et sp. nov.	Druckenmiller, Hurum, Knutsen, & Nakrem
2012	Spitrasaurus larseni sp. nov.	Knutsen, Druckenmiller, & Hurum
2012	Spitrasaurus wensaasi gen. et sp. nov.	Knutsen, Druckenmiller, & Hurum
2012	Djupedalia engeri gen. et sp. nov.	Knutsen, Druckenmiller, & Hurum
2012	Pliosaurus funkei sp. nov.	Knutsen, Druckenmiller, & Hurum
2010	Athabascasaurus bitumineus gen. et sp. nov.	Druckenmiller & Maxwell
2009	Nichollssaura borealis gen. et comb. nov.	Druckenmiller & Russell
2006	Wapuskanectes betsynichollsae gen. et sp. nov.	Druckenmiller & Russell
2002	Edgarosaurus muddi gen. et sp. nov.	Druckenmiller

== Predator X ==
In 2009, Druckenmiller was part of the History Channel documentary Predator X, to discuss his find in Svalbard of a pliosaur suggested to have a bite four times stronger than Tyrannosaurus rex. Druckenmiller and his colleagues were later interviewed by National Geographic, The Link, Live Science, and FoxNews. In the Norwegian Journal of Geology, Druckenmiller and colleagues named the creature Pliosaurus funkei. A fictional movie titled "Extinction: Predator X" was apparently inspired by the documentary and dig.
