= Wapitisaurus =

Wapitisaurus Temporal range: Early Triassic

Scientific classification
- Kingdom: Animalia
- Phylum: Chordata
- Class: Reptilia
- Order: †Thalattosauria
- Superfamily: †Thalattosauroidea
- Genus: †Wapitisaurus; Brinkman, 1988

Type species
- Wapitisaurus problematicus Brinkman, 1988

Extinct genus of marine reptiles

Wapitisaurus is an extinct genus of thalattosaur from the Early Triassic. Its type and only species is Wapitisaurus problematicus. Its remains were discovered in the Vega-Phroso Member of the Sulphur Mountain Formation in British Columbia, Canada.

Wapitisaurus was originally described as a member of Weigeltisauridae, a family of gliding reptiles that otherwise is only known from the Permian period. However, subsequent study determined it was a member of Thalattosauria, a group of unusual marine reptiles that lived during the Triassic period. The length of Wapitisaurus has been estimated to be between 1 and 1.9 metres (3.3 and 6.2 ft), similar to other thalattosaurs.
