= Agkistrognathus =

Agkistrognathus Temporal range: Middle Triassic, Anisian–Ladinian

Scientific classification
- Domain: Eukaryota
- Kingdom: Animalia
- Phylum: Chordata
- Class: Reptilia
- Order: †Thalattosauria
- Family: †Thalattosauridae
- Genus: †Agkistrognathus; Nicholls, 1993

Type species
- †Agkistrognathus campbelli Nicholls, 1993

Extinct genus of reptiles

Agkistrognathus is an extinct genus of thalattosaurian which lived in the early to middle Triassic of British Columbia, Canada. There is only one species known in this genus, Agkistrognathus campbelli. The genus name translates to "hook jaw" while the species name refers to Bob Campbell, who discovered the only known specimen.

== Description ==
Agkistrognathus is a thalattosaurian, a group of marine reptiles with long, paddle-like tails and independently movable digits. Agkistrognathus can be distinguished from other thalattosaurians due to having conical, closely spaced teeth which are smallest in the middle of the jaw and deep dentaries with hooked front ends. These features may have given it a powerful bite . The dentaries are also bifurcated at their posterior ends, with both forks being the same length but the dorsal one being much deeper. This combination is unique to Agkistrognathus.

Agkistrognathus is probably closely related to Thalattosaurus and Paralonectes due to having conical teeth at the mandibular symphysis.

== History ==
Agkistrognathus was discovered in the Sulphur Mountain formation in eastern British Columbia. It was described in a 1993 article along with several other new thalattosaurs from the same locality: Thalattosaurus borealis, Paralonectes merriami, an additional specimen referred to Paralonectes, and an unnamed species. Based on the conodont fauna, this locality is believed to be early to mid triassic in age, probably from the late Anisian to early Ladinian. Thus, these species may be the oldest thalattosaurians known.

The holotype of Agkistrognathus campbelli, TMP 89.127.6, is a disarticulated skull including a maxilla, premaxilla, vomer, dentaries, angular, splenial, and other unidentified fragments.
