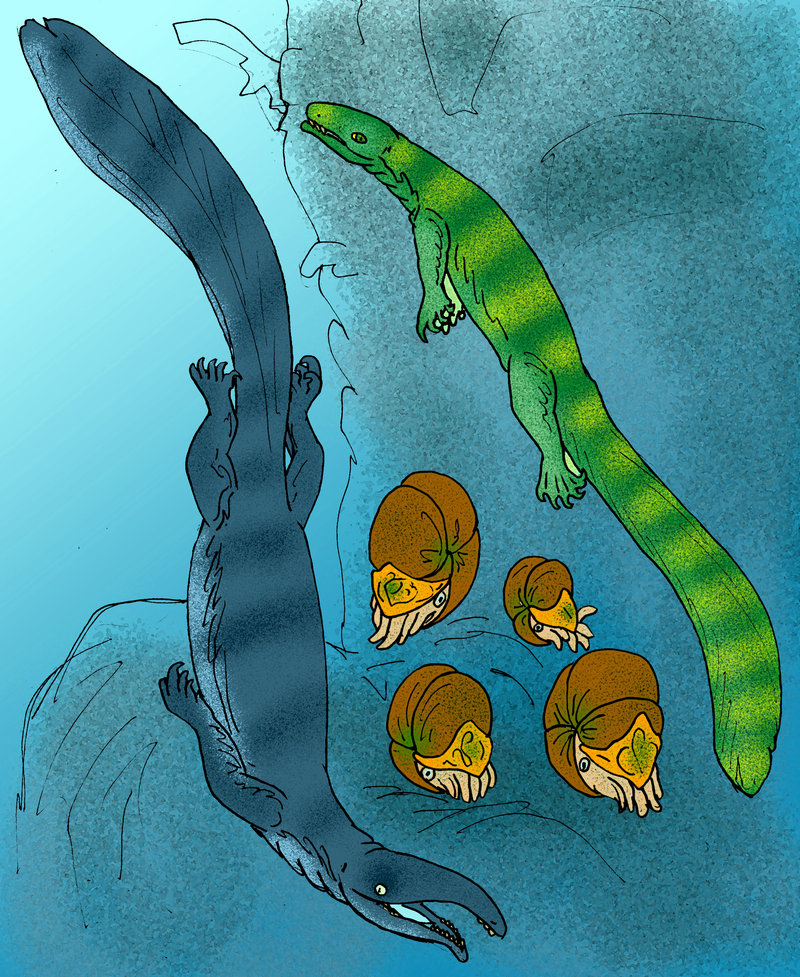
- Thalattosaurus alexandrae (left) and Nectosaurus halius (right) of Late Triassic California

Scientific classification
- Domain: Eukaryota
- Kingdom: Animalia
- Phylum: Chordata
- Class: Reptilia
- Clade: Neodiapsida
- Order: †Thalattosauria
- Superfamily: †Thalattosauroidea
- Genus: †Nectosaurus
- Species: †N. halius

Binomial name
- †Nectosaurus halius Merriam 1905

= Nectosaurus =

Nectosaurus Temporal range: Late Triassic, 235.0–221.5 Ma

Extinct genus of reptiles

Nectosaurus is a genus of thalattosaur (marine diapsid reptiles) which lived during the Late Triassic in what is now California. The type and only known species, Nectosaurus halius, was found in the Hosselkus Limestone and described by John C. Merriam in 1905, making it one of the first thalattosaurians known (along with Thalattosaurus).

== Discovery ==
Nectosaurus is known from fragmentary remains. The holotype, UCMP 9124, is an incomplete skeleton including vertebrae, a humerus, coracoid, ulna, radius, and partial skull and mandibles.

Many isolated bones from other localities were referred to the genus by Merriam in 1908. In addition, a partial skull from the same locality, UCMP 9120, was referred to the genus as Nectosaurus sp. in 1905. This specimen is much larger than any specimen of Nectosaurus halius but is otherwise similar to several referred specimens. UCMP 9120 may represent an adult specimen, making the holotype a juvenile specimen, a hypothesis supported by the fact that the holotype has unfused dermal bones and incomplete ossification on certain long bones.

== Description ==
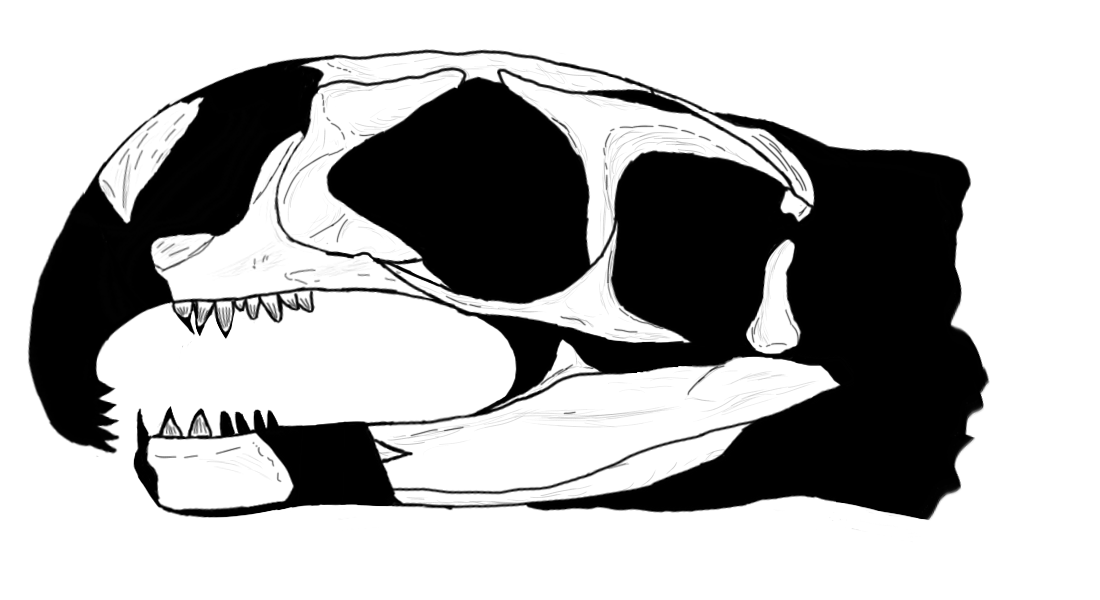
Known skull elements of Nectosaurus specimens.

Based on the position of the vomers, the general shape of the premaxillae was inferred to be that of a dramatically downward hooking rostrum, descending at a vertical angle. This trait is also known in Hescheleria as well as a specimen referred to Paralonectes in 1993.Nectosaurus also had pointed, needle-like teeth (particularly in the front of the maxilla) and a mandible with a very high and pointed coronoid process. Like other thalattosauroids, the vomers and pterygoid also had teeth.

== Classification ==
Nectosaurus was a member of a group of marine reptiles known as thalattosaurs, characterized by their long, paddle-like tails and short legs with independently movable digits. Most thalattosaurs had extended premaxillae, forming a rostrum. Thalattosaurs with downward curving, hook-like premaxillae (such as Nectosaurus) are known as thalattosauroids.

Although a 2001 analysis considered it a close relative of Xinpusaurus and Paralonectes because it was interpreted as having an upward-curving maxilla, further inquiry has shown that this was mistaken.
