= Elizabeth Nicholls =

Canadian scientist

Elizabeth L. Nicholls
- Born: January 31, 1946; Oakland, California
- Died: October 18, 2004 (aged 58)
- Education: University of California, Berkeley, University of Calgary
- Scientific career
- Fields: Paleontology
- Workplaces: Royal Tyrrell Museum of Paleontology
- Doctoral advisor: Anthony P. Russell

Elizabeth (Betsy) Laura Nicholls (January 31, 1946 – October 18, 2004) was an American-Canadian paleontologist who specialized in Triassic marine reptiles. She was a paleontologist at the Royal Tyrrell Museum in Alberta, Canada.

== Early life and education ==
Nicholls was born in Oakland, California, and received her undergraduate degree in 1968 from the University of California, Berkeley and her graduate degrees, an M.Sc. in 1972 and a Ph.D. in 1989, from the University of Calgary, working under Samuel Paul Welles.

== Career ==
She was the co-editor with American vertebrate paleontologist Jack Murff Callaway of the book Ancient Marine Reptiles. Latoplatecarpus nichollsae was named in her honor, as was Nichollsemys.

Nicholls was a 2000 Rolex Awards for Enterprise laureate for exploration for her leadership in excavating the remains of a large ichthyosaur, Shonisaurus sikanniensis (Nicholls & Manabe, 2004), from the Upper Triassic Pardonet Formation in a remote area of the Sikanni Chief River in British Columbia.

== Death and legacy ==
Nicholls died from cancer in 2004 at age 58.

On May 6, 2017 the Canadian Fossil Discovery Centre established the Dr. Elizabeth 'Betsy' Nicholls Award for Excellence in Paleontology at its annual Dig Deep Gala. The announcement was made in the presence of Nicholls' husband and children to whom a plaque was given in honour of the occasion.

== Selected publications ==
- Giant ichthyosaurs of the Triassic—a new species of Shonisaurus from the Pardonet Formation (Norian: Late Triassic) of British Columbia, EL Nicholls, M Manabe - Journal of Vertebrate Paleontology, 2004
- New material of Qianichthyosaurus Li, 1999 (Reptilia, Ichthyosauria) from the Late Triassic of southern China, and implications for the distribution of Triassic icthosaurs, EL Nicholls, C Wei, M Manabe - Journal of Vertebrate Paleontology, 2003
- New thalattosaurs (Reptilia: Diapsida) from the Triassic Sulphur Mountain Formation of Wapiti Lake, British Columbia, EL Nicholls, D Brinkman - Journal of Paleontology, 1993
- New material of Toxochelys latiremis Cope, and a revision of the genus Toxochelys (Testvoines, Chelonioidea), EL Nicholls - Journal of Vertebrate Paleontology, 1988
- The first record of the mosasaur Hainosaurus (Reptilia: Lacertilia) from North America, EL Nicholls - Canadian Journal of Earth Sciences, 1988
- The oldest known North American occurrence of the Plesiosauria (Reptilia: Sauropterygia) from the Liassic (Lower Jurassic) Fernie Group, Alberta, Canada, EL Nicholls - Canadian Journal of Earth Sciences, 1976
