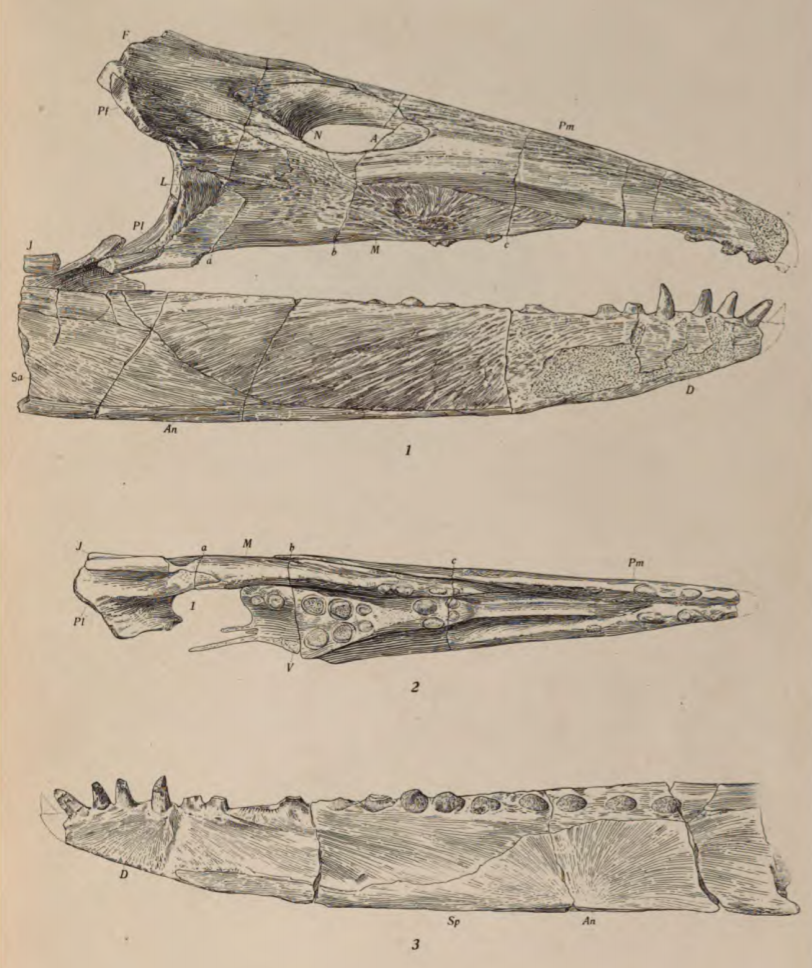
- Illustration of T. alexandrae holotype

Scientific classification
- Kingdom: Animalia
- Phylum: Chordata
- Class: Reptilia
- Order: †Thalattosauria
- Family: †Thalattosauridae
- Genus: †Thalattosaurus; Merriam, 1904

Type species
- †Thalattosaurus alexandrae Merriam, 1904

Species
- †T. alexandrae (Merriam, 1904) (type); †T. borealis (Nicholls and Brinkman, 1993); †T. perrini? (Merriam, 1905); †T. shastensis? (Merriam, 1905)

= Thalattosaurus =

Thalattosaurus Temporal range: Late Triassic, 235.0–221.5 Ma

Extinct genus of reptiles

Thalattosaurus (pronounced: /θəˌlætəˈsɔːrəs/, tha-la-to-SORE-us from Ancient Greek: θάλαττα, romanized: thálatta, lit. 'sea' and σαῦρος, saûros, 'lizard') is an extinct genus of marine reptile in the family Thalattosauroidea. Known exclusively from the Triassic period, it was a 2–3 metres (6.6–9.8 ft) long shellfish-eating diapsid with paddle-like limbs and a down-turned rostrum. Fossils were recovered in the Lower and Middle Triassic Sulphur Mountain Formation of British Columbia as well as the Upper Triassic Hosselkus Limestone of California. It has gained notoriety as a result of studies on general diapsid phylogeny.

Although originally described as four distinct species by Merriam in 1905, one was proven to be T. alexandrae upon further inspection and another has a missing type specimen. Currently it is believed to include two known species; Thalattosaurus alexandrae and T. borealis.

== Discovery and naming ==
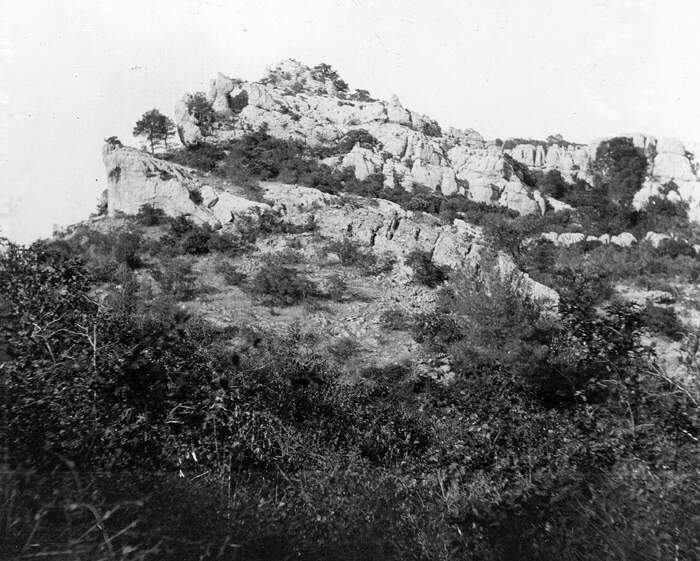
The Hosselkus Limestone where remains of Thalattosaurus have been found

In summer 1903, Annie Alexander led an expedition with Miss Edna Wemple, Eustace Furlong, Merriam John C, W.B. Esterly, and Mr. F.S. Ray to Shasta County where they discovered what they initially thought was Shastasaurus. One of the fossils were found in the North Fork of Squaw Creek (Triassic of the United States) in Shasta County, California. The environment it was found in was a shelly/skeletal limestone with a horizon composed largely of broken shells. It was estimated to be from the Hosselkus Limestone Formation from the Carnian period, dating from 235 to 221.5 million years ago. It was later collected by the University of California. The fossil found by Annie Alexander in 1903 had much of original bone in preorbital area gone, vomer was exposed, an incomplete mandible, two dorsal ribs and centra, and three articulated caudal vertebrae pressed against the vomer.

After Merriam's further studies, it was categorized as a new species named Thalattosarus alexandrae. The first thalattosaurs to be described were Thalattosaurus and Nectosaurus from the Upper Triassic of California by Merriam in 1904, 1905 and 1906. Thalattosaurus alexandrae was named by Merriam in 1904. Its name is Thalattosaurus meaning "sea lizard" and alexandrae in honor of Annie Alexander, an amateur paleontologist and patron to the University of California Museum of Paleontology. This material was later reviewed by Nicholls in 1999.

Originally four subtaxa of Thalattosaurus were classified; Thalattosaurus alexandrae, Thalattosaurus perrini, and Thalattosaurus shastensis by Merriam but later additional examination of the type of T. shastensis suggested that it does not belong in the genus Thalattosaurus. It is still currently under study. The type skull of T. perrini has not been located, but the vomer figured by Merriam in 1905 did not differ from the vomer of T. alexandrae.

In 1993, another species named Thalattosarus borealis was found in a talus slope near Wapiti Lake, British Columbia, in the Sulphur Mountain Formation. The environment, similar to the discovery of T. alexandrae, was also marine shale, and marl. This specimen was discovered and collected by the Royal Tyrrell Museum of Paleontology field crew. Thalattosaurus borealis was named after its Northern discovery location, with Thalattosaurus meaning "ocean lizard" and borealis coming from boreas (Greek word, βορέας) meaning "Northern." Discovered elements include the anterior part of skull, incomplete mandible, centra, isolated ribs, and left pterygoid.

== Description ==
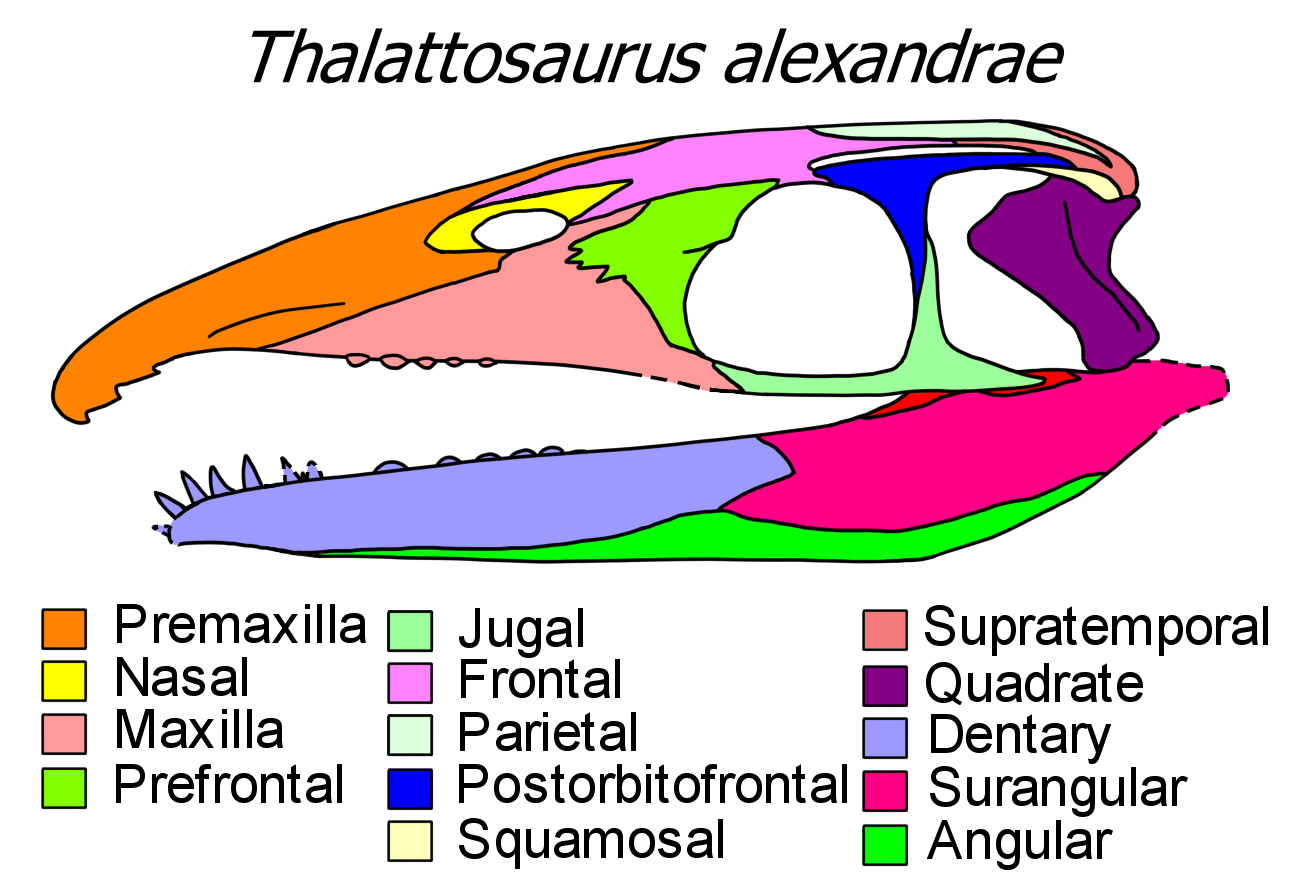
A modern skull diagram of Thalattosaurus alexandrae

As noted by Merriam in 1905, the skull of the holotype, referred to as UCMP 9085, was preserved in four pieces. They were originally connected by calcite vein-filled cracks, but were separated during preparation. Three of these four pieces found made up the rostrum. When aligned, the rostrum shape suggested dorsal curvature of the anterior end of the maxilla but ventral deflection in the anterior end of premaxilla. The prefrontal, however, came down ventrally under the margin of the maxilla and contacts the anterior tip of the suborbital process A line drawn from the preserved anterior alveolar margin of the maxilla to the lower edge of the prefrontal showed that the ventral margin of the maxilla was straight, very similar to the rostral structure known of Clarazia. Upon further examination, the other characteristics found true of this fossil were a striated external surface of bone with smooth bone resembling "pseudodont teeth". The first of which was blunt, procumbent and short, the second was pointed and thinner, with the third (although the tip was broken) the thick base implied a blunt tooth. There was an additional broken stump which may suggest a fourth tooth.

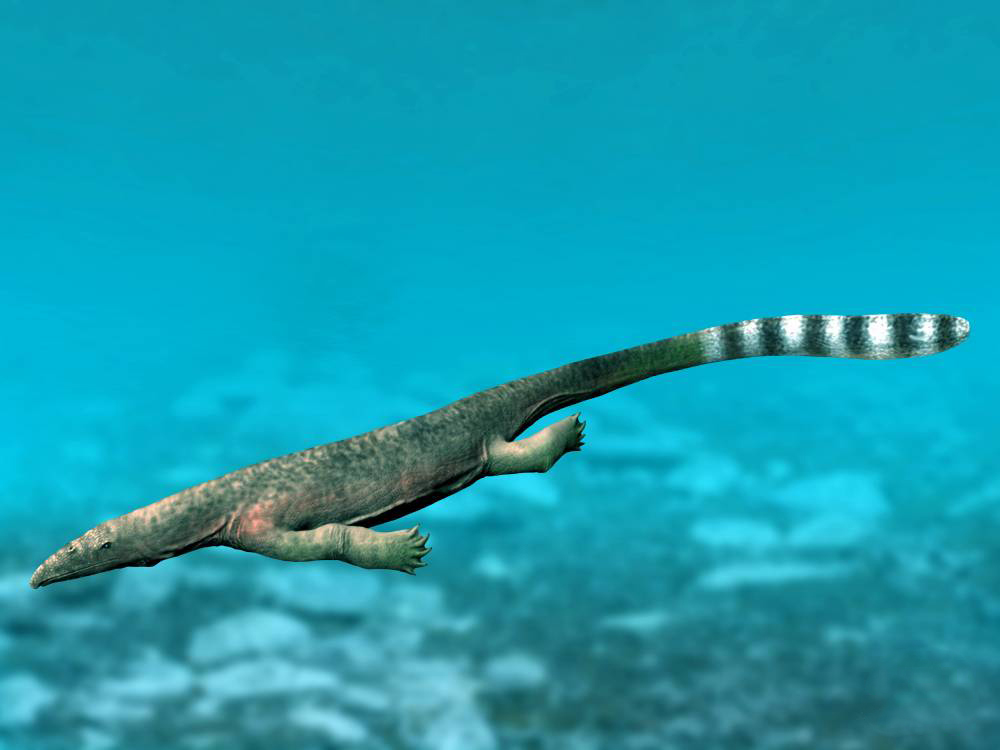
Reconstruction of T. alexandrae

Phylogenetic interrelationships of Thalattosaurus is one of the better known from the thalattosaur genera. When comparing T. borealis to the type species, T. alexandrae, the most apparent difference is size. Thalattosaurus borealis is much smaller, with the distance from the tip of the snout to the anterior edge of the orbit being less than 60mm. In T. alexandrae, however, this distance is almost 200mm. Initially a difference in age (juvenile vs. adult) was suspected but because the bone in the T. borealis specimen is thoroughly ossified and the caudal vertebral neural arches are fused to the centra, it was concluded that the specimen was a fully formed adult. The vomer of T. borealis also differs from the vomer of T. alexandrae in the type of dentition present. The vomer of T. alexandrae has two rows of teeth closely set anteriorly and divergent posteriorly with ten teeth per row. These are low-crowned, bulbous teeth that are set in sockets. The vomer of T. borealis, on the other hand, has six high, triangular teeth that are fused to the bone.

T. alexandrae had only a single row of teeth present but the vomer must have developed as a paired structure, so it can be assumed that there must have been more than a single row of teeth. The bone is split sagittally and it is possible that an additional row of teeth was present but broke away during preservation. However, there is no evidence of a paired, diverging tooth row like we see in T. alexandrae. The wide, button-like teeth on the dentary are characteristic of all three, Thalattosaurus, Clarazia, and Paralonectes. The posterior mandibular teeth of T. borealis differ from these genera, however, being set flush with the margin of the jaw. In both T. alexandrae and Clarazia the posterior, bulbous teeth are set slightly ventral and medial to the jaw margin. In all thalattosaurs found, the posterior end of the dentary bifurcates into two diverging processes (upper and lower). This can be distinguished from Clarazia in which these two process are almost equal in length whereas in T. borealis the ventral process is much longer than the upper.

=== Down-turned snout ===
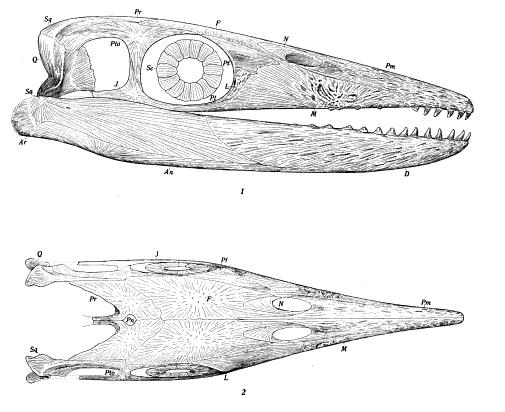
Original reconstruction of T. alexandrae skull by Merriam in 1905 incorrectly portraying a straight snout

Originally illustrated by Merriam in 1905, his reconstruction of the skull of T. alexandrae portrayed the rostrum as being straight and showed six conical, striated teeth on the premaxilla. This reconstruction has since been used in various books and published journals but is not accurate and has been corrected after Nicholls published on the subject in 1999. The premaxilla of the type specimen of T. alexandrae is distinctly curved. The three "teeth" previously illustrated are not teeth at all, but more like bony extensions of the premaxilla-"pseudodont" teeth similar to those found in T. borealis. This pseudodont dentition possibly suggests a possibility of a beak being present, similar to turtles and birds.

Thalattosauroidea (which contains Clarazia and Thalattosaurus) have a relatively short rostrum, distinct from the elongate primitive condition, with convergent lateral margins that terminate in a pointed tip. It is also characteristic of their supratemporal to contact the frontal bone, having a heavy postorbital bar, diastema present that separates the premaxillary from the maxillary teeth, and a deep lower jaw. The Thalattosauroidea are easily distinguished by their down-turned snouts. In Clarazia and Thalattosaurus, the snouts taper to a narrow tip, with the premaxilla at the tip down-turned.

== Paleobiology ==
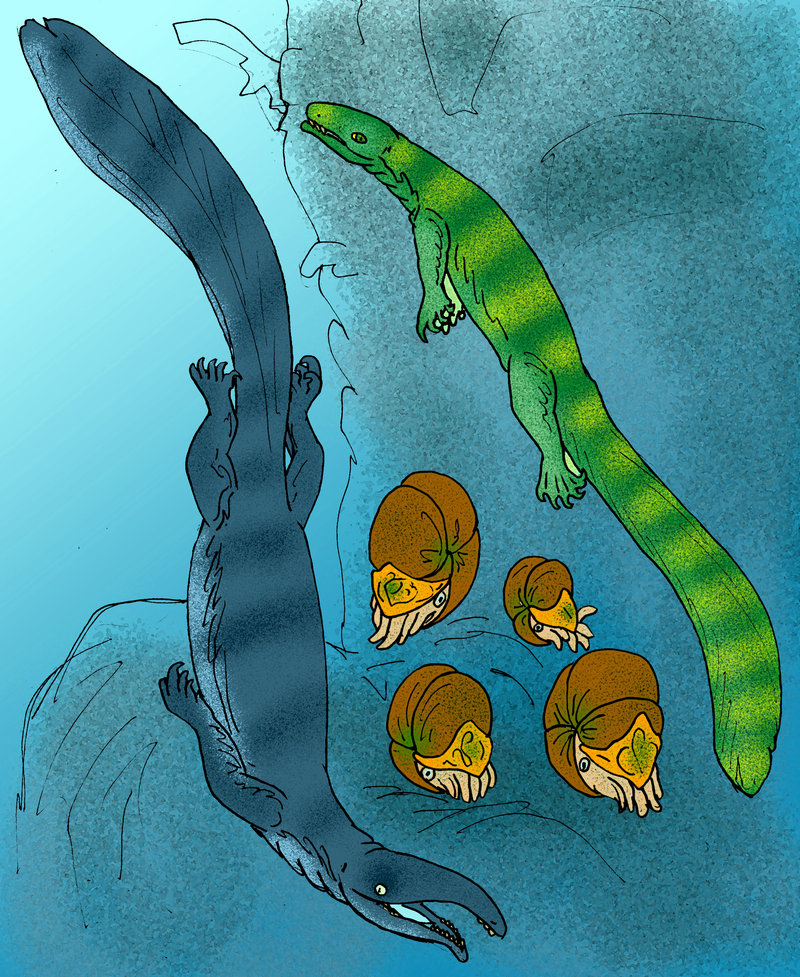
Thalattosaurus (left) with relative Nectosaurus (right) hunting shellfish.

Thalattosaurus alexandrae was about around 2 meters (7 ft) long and an excellent swimmer. Thalattosaur limbs were generally not paddle-like, but Thalattosaurus limbs were. It had a long flattened tail and claws possibly used to withstand the force of the surf when crawling up on shore.

The Sulphur Mountain Formation, where remains of Thalattosaurus have been found, consists of a series of marine siltstones, silty limestones, and fine gained sandstones. All of the thalattosaur specimens from Wapiti Lake are preserved in sandstones, suggestive of shallow water conditions. It is likely that they often spent their time near the shore instead of deep-sea, open-water environments. Its remains were found in a marine shale and marl environment, which suggests it fed on marine life such as shelled animals. It had strong crushing teeth to crack the shells of its prey.
