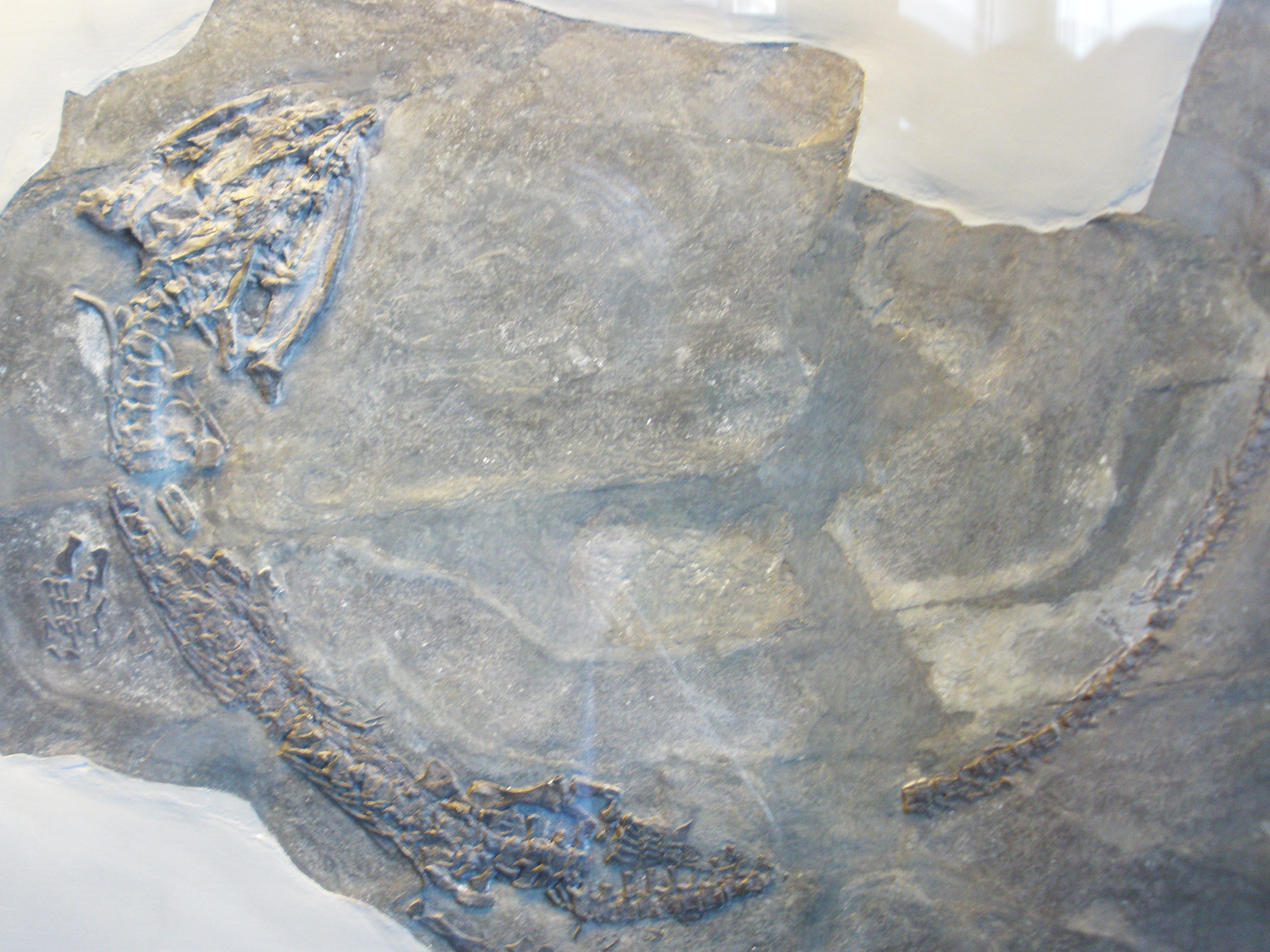
- C. schinzi fossil at the Natural History Museum of the University of Zurich

Scientific classification
- Kingdom: Animalia
- Phylum: Chordata
- Class: Reptilia
- Order: †Thalattosauria
- Superfamily: †Thalattosauroidea
- Genus: †Clarazia; Peyer, 1936

Type species
- Clarazia schinzi Peyer, 1936

= Clarazia =

Clarazia Temporal range: Middle Triassic, 247.2–235.0 Ma

Extinct genus of reptiles

Clarazia is an extinct genus of thalattosaur from the Middle Triassic of Monte San Giorgio in Switzerland. It is represented by a single type species, Clarazia schinzi, which was named in 1936.

== See also ==
- Askeptosaurus
- Marine reptile
