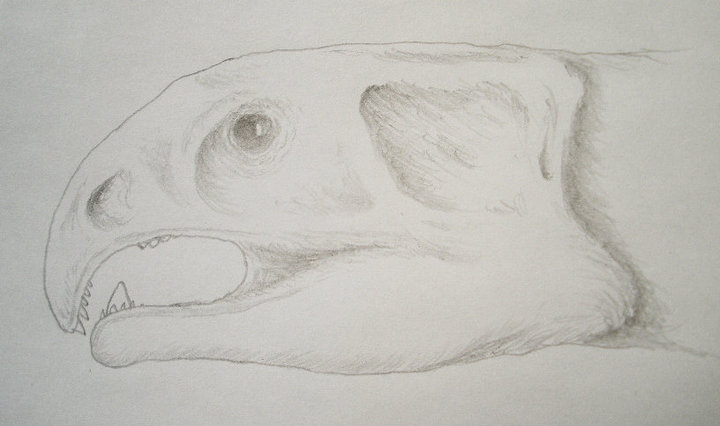
- Reconstruction of the head of Hescheleria

Scientific classification
- Domain: Eukaryota
- Kingdom: Animalia
- Phylum: Chordata
- Class: Reptilia
- Order: †Thalattosauria
- Family: †Thalattosauridae
- Clade: †Claraziidae
- Genus: †Hescheleria; Peyer, 1936

Type species
- Hescheleria ruebeli Peyer, 1936b

= Hescheleria =

Hescheleria Temporal range: Anisian-Carnian, 247.2–235 Ma

Extinct genus of reptiles

Hescheleria is an extinct genus of thalattosaurian marine reptile from the Middle Triassic (247.2 to 235 Ma) of Monte San Giorgio in Switzerland. It is represented by a single type species, H. ruebeli, which was named in 1936.

== Description ==
Like other thalattosaurs, Hescheleria has a slender lizard-like body with a long paddle-shaped tail. It is estimated to have grown to approximately 1 meter in length.

The skull possesses an unusually-shaped snout, with sharply downturned premaxillae. This forms a toothy hook at almost a right angle to the rest of the jaw, with a large diastema. The mandible is considerably robust and is dotted with small sharp teeth, along with a pair of pointed conical projections towards the tip, the function of which is unknown. The strange skull suggests a highly specialized lifestyle. It has been speculated that the projections on the mandible were used to crush hard-shelled prey such as molluscs. Other paleontologists disagree with this hypothesis, arguing that the projections do not occlude against any other potential crushing surface in the jaws, instead making contact with the rostral diastema.
