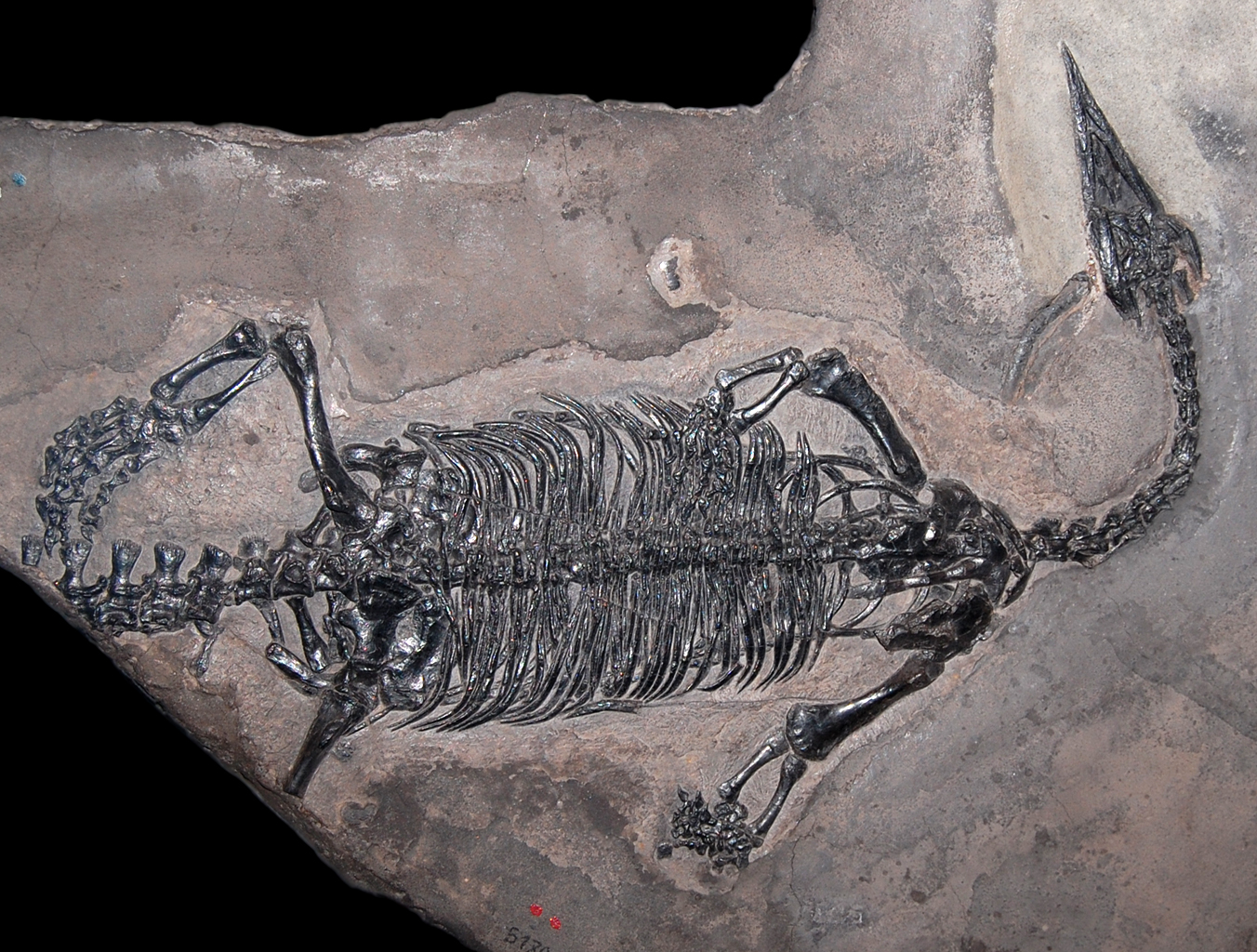
- Endennasaurus acutirostris fossil

Scientific classification
- Domain: Eukaryota
- Kingdom: Animalia
- Phylum: Chordata
- Class: Reptilia
- Order: †Thalattosauria
- Family: †Endennasauridae
- Genus: †Endennasaurus; Renesto, 1984

Type species
- †Endennasaurus acutirostris Renesto, 1984

= Endennasaurus =

Endennasaurus Temporal range: Late Triassic ~215–212 Ma

Extinct genus of reptiles

Endennasaurus is an extinct genus of thalattosaurian from the Upper Triassic of Italy. It was found in and named after the Endenna cave, composed of Zorzino Limestone in Lombardia.

== Gallery ==
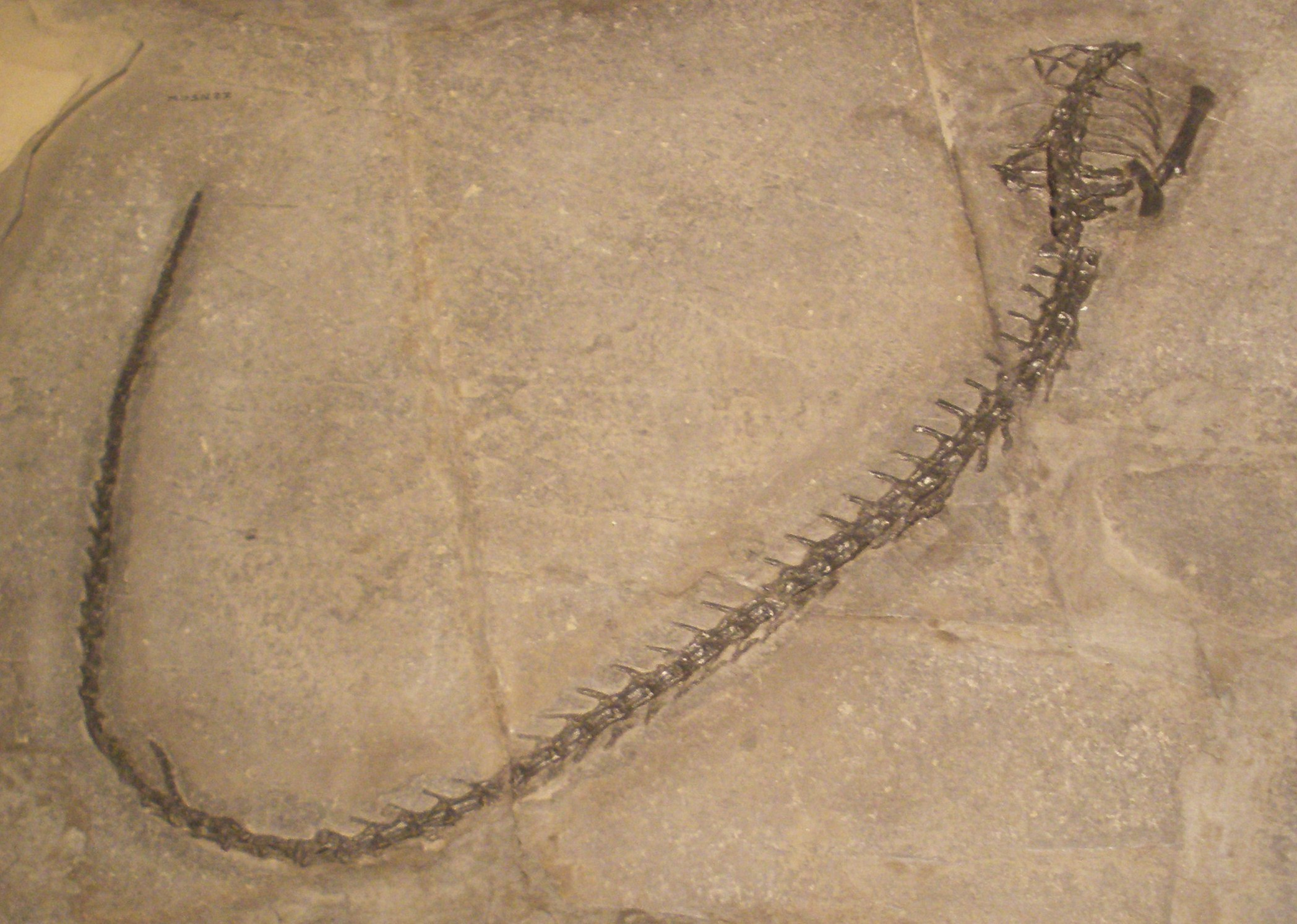
Endennasaurus acutirostris tail

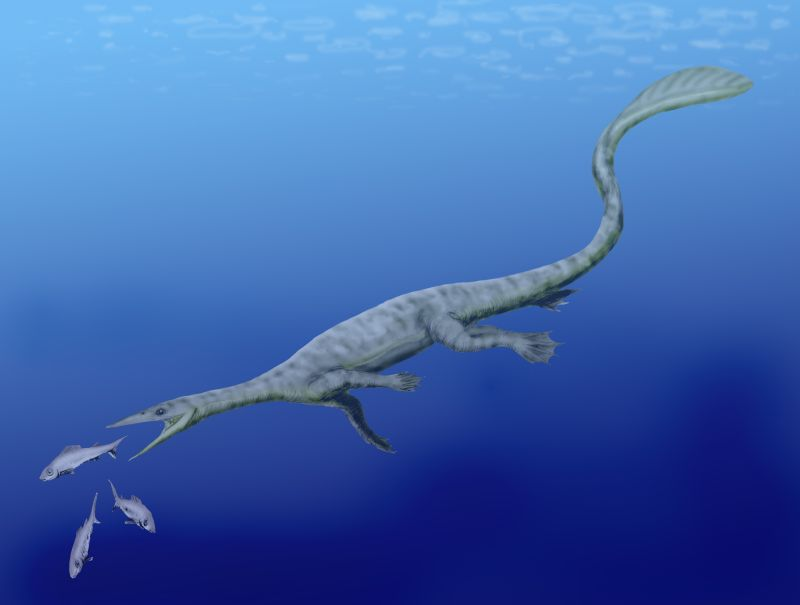
Restoration
