= Metacarpal synostosis =

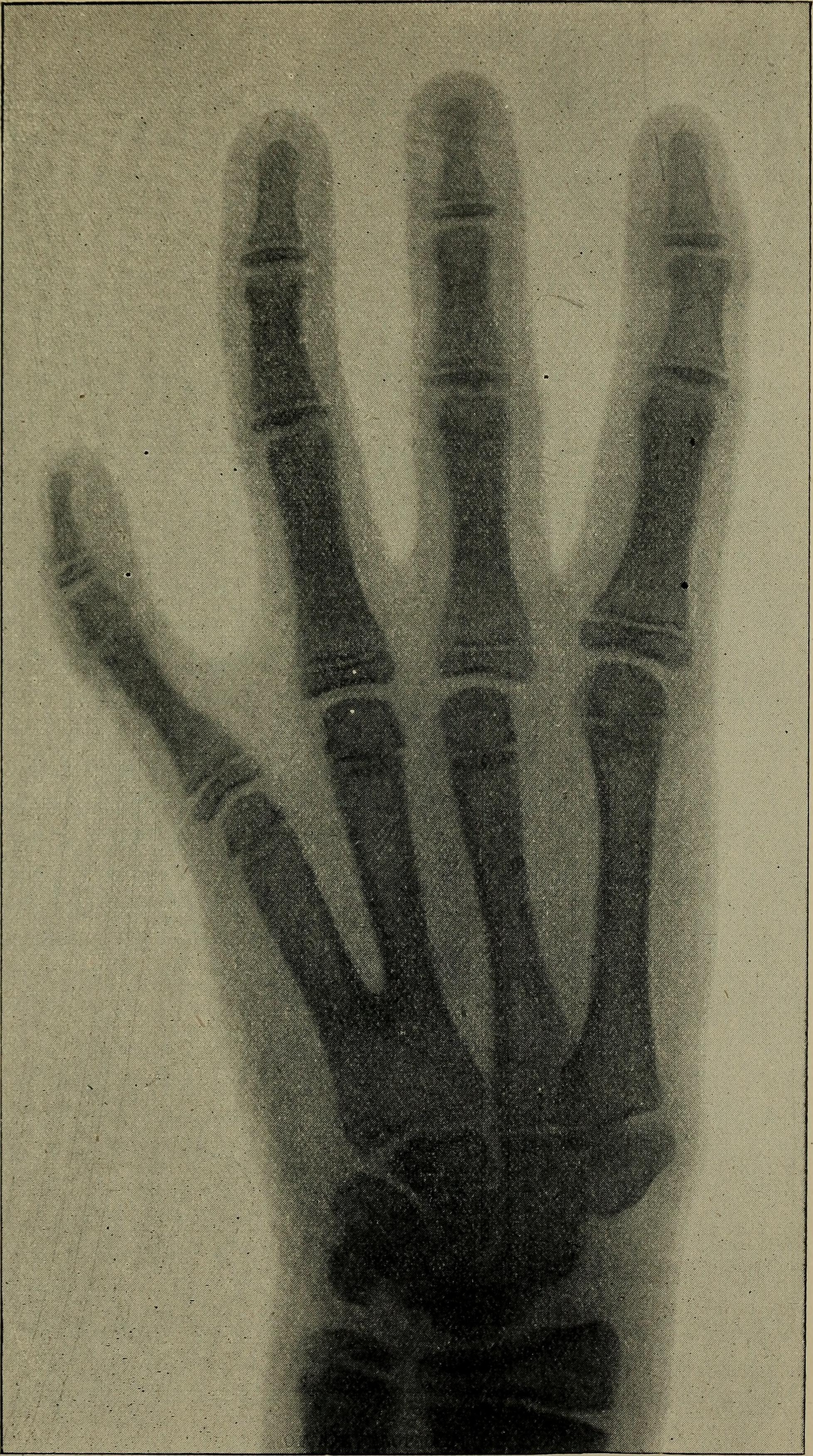
- Metacarpal synostosis affecting the fourth and fifth metacarpals of a left hand with thumb hypoplasia type V.
- Specialty: Medical genetics
- Causes: Genetic mutation
- Frequency: rare, less than 0.07% of the population is born with this trait
- Deaths: -

Metacarpal synostosis is a rare congenital difference which is characterized by the fusion of 2 (or, in rare cases, more) metacarpals of the hand, which are usually shortened. It is most commonly seen as a fusion of the 4th and 5th metacarpals. It is a type of non-syndromic syndactyly/synostosis. Autosomal dominant and X-linked recessive inheritance patterns have been reported.

== Signs and symptoms ==
The fusion of two or more metacarpal bones is the characteristic feature of this malformation, however this itself causes more symptoms, such as clinodactyly, shortening of the fused metacarpal bones, and reduced range of mobility of the fingers supported by the metacarpals.

== Complications ==
There are usually no serious health complications associated with this condition, although severe cases which also involve syndactyly might interfere with hand function.

== Causes ==
The variant of MS that fuses the 4th and 5th metacarpals is caused by X-linked recessive mutations (alterations or duplications) in the FGF16 gene, in chromosome X.

It is a feature of various rare disorders such as Apert's syndrome, and can occur alongside other isolated congenital hand/foot malformations including syndactyly, cleft hand, metatarsal synostosis, and polydactyly.

A syndromic form of syndactyly known as syndactyly type V has metacarpal and metatarsal synostosis as symptoms.

== Diagnosis ==
The following diagnostic methods can be used for metacarpal synostosis:

- Physical examination
- Radiographs
- Whole exome sequencing
- Sanger sequencing

== Treatment ==
Treatment for this malformation typically involves the following:

1. Osteotomy (for splitting/separating the synostosic metacarpals)

2. Bone graft (for lengthening of shortened metacarpals, usually the fifth)

3. Ligament reconstruction

4. Tendon transposition (for the extensor digiti minimi quinti)

== Epidemiology ==
This condition is thought to affect approximately 0.02% to 0.07% of the general population.

== Associations ==
A large family has been described as having nonsense mutations of the FGF16 gene which resulted in metacarpal synostosis and, unexpectedly, in heart disease.
