= Boxer's fracture =

Break of the fifth metacarpal bone of the hand near the knuckle

- Other names: Metacarpal neck fracture of the little finger, scrapper's fracture, bar room fracture, street fighter's fracture
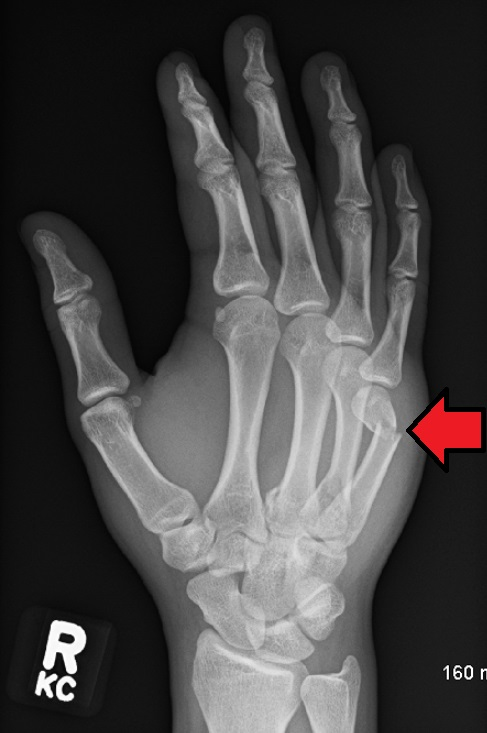
- Boxer's fracture of the 5th metacarpal head from punching a wall
- Specialty: Emergency medicine, orthopedics
- Symptoms: Pain, depressed knuckle
- Causes: Hitting an object with a closed fist
- Diagnostic method: Based on symptoms and confirmed by X-rays
- Treatment: Buddy taping and a tensor bandage, reduction and splinting
- Medication: Ibuprofen, paracetamol (acetaminophen)
- Prognosis: Generally good
- Frequency: 20% of hand fractures

A boxer's fracture is the break of the fifth metacarpal bone of the hand near the knuckle. Occasionally, it is used to refer to fractures of the fourth metacarpal as well. Symptoms include pain and a depressed knuckle.

Classically, it occurs after a person hits an object with a closed fist. The knuckle is then bent towards the palm of the hand. Diagnosis is generally suspected based on symptoms and confirmed with X-rays.

For most fractures with less than 70 degrees of angulation, buddy taping and a tensor bandage resulted in similar outcomes to reduction with splinting. In those with more than 70 degrees of angulation or in which the broken finger is rotated, reduction and splinting may be recommended.

They represent about a fifth of hand fractures. They occur more commonly in males than females. Both short and long term outcomes are generally good. The knuckle, however, typically remains somewhat deformed.

== Signs and symptoms ==
The symptoms are pain and tenderness in the specific location of the hand, which corresponds to the metacarpal bone around the knuckle. When a fracture occurs, there may be a snapping or popping sensation. There will be swelling of the hand along with discoloration or bruising in the affected area. Abrasions or lacerations of the hand are also likely to occur. The respective finger may be misaligned, and movement of that finger may be limited and painful.

== Causes ==
Metacarpal fractures are usually caused by the impact of a clenched fist with a hard, immovable object, such as a skull or a wall. When a punch impacts with improper form, the force occurs at an angle towards the palm, creating a dorsal bend in the bone, ultimately causing the fracture when the bone is bent too far.

When a boxer punches with proper form, the knuckles of the second and third metacarpal align linearly with the articulating radius, followed linearly by the humerus. Due to the linear articulation of bones, the force is able to travel freely across these joints and bones and be dissipated without injury. Therefore, fractures of the second or third metacarpals are rare, with fractures of the 4th and 5th metacarpals comprising the vast majority of metacarpal fractures.

== Diagnosis ==
Diagnosis by a doctor's examination is the most common, often confirmed by x-rays. X-ray is used to display the fracture and the angulations of the fracture. A CT scan may be done in very rare cases to provide a more detailed picture.

== Prevention ==
Boxers and other combat athletes routinely use hand wraps and boxing gloves to help stabilize the hand, greatly reducing pain and risk of injury during impact. Proper punching form is the most important factor to prevent this type of fracture.

== Treatment ==
Ice is applied to relieve pain and swelling. Any open wounds are cleansed to avoid infection.

For most fractures with less than 70 degrees of angulation, buddy taping and a tensor bandage resulted in similar outcomes to reduction with splinting. Conservative treatment with early mobilization has also been found non-inferior when compared to surgical treatment with bouquet pinning for fractures presenting with less than 45 degrees of palmar angulation.

In rare cases when the fracture causes rotational deformity or severe angulation surgery may be required to place pins or plates in the bone to hold the pieces in place.

== Prognosis ==
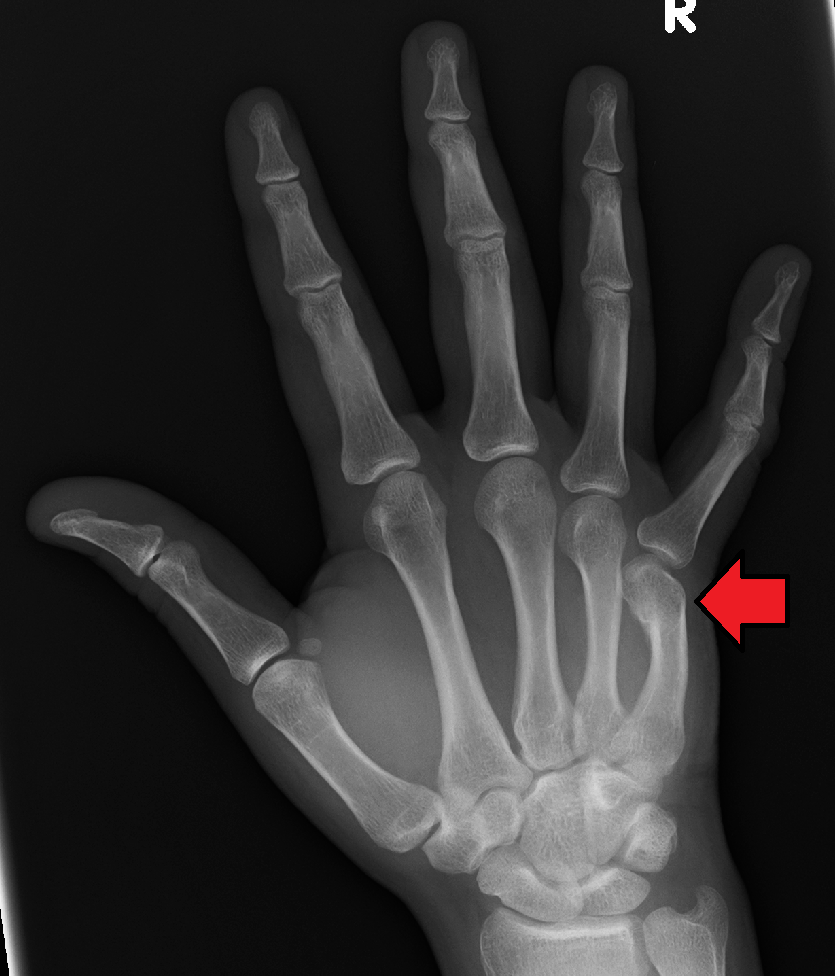
A healed fracture of the neck of the 5th metacarpal

Prognosis for these fractures is generally good, with total healing time not exceeding 12 weeks. The first two weeks will show significantly reduced overall swelling, with improvement in clenching ability showing up first. Ability to extend the fingers in all directions appears to improve more slowly. Hard casts are rarely required, and soft casts or splints can be removed for brief periods of time to allow for cleaning and drying the skin underneath the splint. Pain from injury varies person to person as with most injuries. Depending on the individual a course of over the counter or narcotic pain medication will suffice. Muscle atrophy of 5 to 15 percent may be expected, with a rehabilitation period of approximately 4 months given adequate therapy. In the mildest of cases, full rehabilitation status can be achieved within 3 to 4 months.

== Epidemiology ==
Hand and wrist injuries are reported to account for fifteen to twenty percent of emergency room injuries, and metacarpal fractures represent a significant number of those injuries. Hand injuries of this sort are most prevalent among fifteen- to thirty-five-year-old males, and the fifth metacarpal is the one most commonly affected.

Males are nearly fifty percent more likely to sustain fracture from a punch mechanism than females. Male intentional punch injuries are correlated predominantly with social deprivation, while female punch intentional injuries show more correlation with psychiatric disorders. Approximately 3.7 male hand injuries, per 1000, per year, and 1.3 female hand injuries, per 1000, per year, have been reported. Common mechanisms of injury are gender specific. Although the fiscal cost is not available, it can be asserted that the cost is reasonably significant per individual, depending on the cost of emergency care, immobilization, surgery, follow up doctors' visits, etc. in addition to the fiscal impact from loss of and/or limited work abilities.

== Terminology ==
As these are colloquial terms, texts and medical dictionaries do not universally agree on precise meanings. Various authorities state that a "boxer's fracture" means a break in specifically the second metacarpal bone or third metacarpal bone, with "bar room fracture" being specific to the fourth metacarpal bone or fifth metacarpal bone. This is derived from boxers properly punching through the 2nd and 3rd knuckles, whereas inexperienced fighters often connect with the weaker 4th and 5th. Though some writers assert that boxer's fracture and bar room fracture are distinct terms representing injuries to different bones, this distinction seems to have been lost and most medical professionals now describe any metacarpal fracture as a "boxer's fracture".
