= Gol ya pooch =

Traditional Iranian game

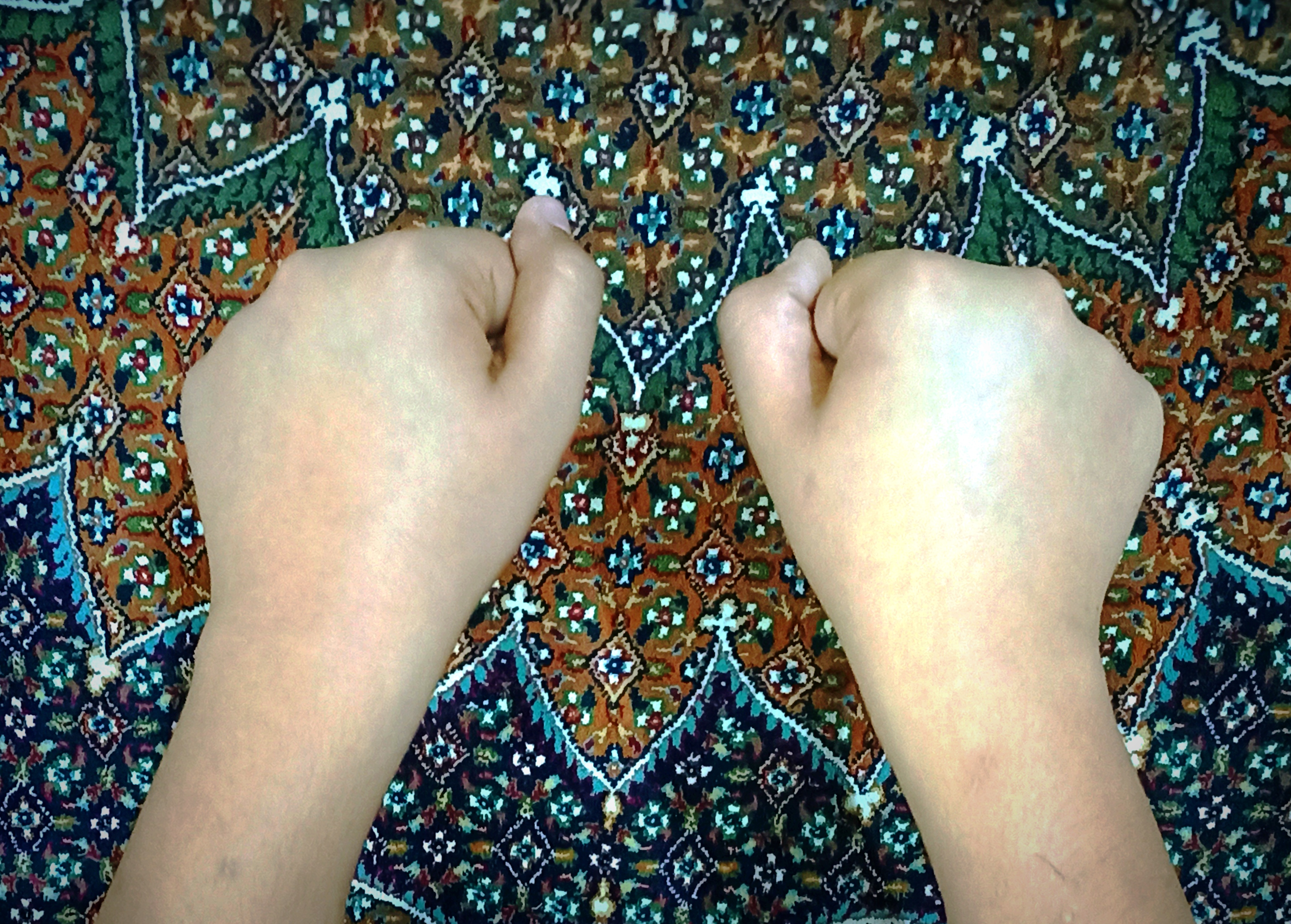
The bead is hidden in one of the clenched hands.

Gol ya Pooch (Persian: گل یا پوچ), which translates to Flower or Empty (or Rose or Empty Hand), is a traditional Iranian game. It is a game of guessing and deception, deeply rooted in ancient Persian culture, and has been a popular pastime in family and friendly gatherings for a long time. It helps to sharpen observation, concentration, intelligence, and the ability to read body language.

== Concept of the game ==
Gol (گل): Refers to the small object that is hidden. This could be a pea, a small stone, a button, a marble, a coin, or any other small item that can easily fit in a clenched fist.

Pooch (پوچ): Means "empty" and refers to the hand that does not contain the "gol."

== History and origins ==
The roots of this game trace back to ancient times in Iran and has been common in various regions of Iran and the Middle East with slight variations and different names. For example, in Iraq and Kuwait, there's a similar game called "Mehbis" (محیبس) where a ring is hidden instead of a small object. "Gol ya Pooch" originated from North Khorasan Province (especially Bidvaz village in Esfarayen county) and gradually spread throughout Iran.

== Rules ==
Gol ya Pooch is typically played in groups between two teams, although it can also be played by two people. The number of players on each team can vary, but usually, each team consists of 3 or more players.

=== Main stages of the game ===
- Choosing the "Gol" and Team Formation:

First, a small object is chosen as the "gol." Players are divided into two teams. A coin toss or similar method determines which team will hide the "gol" first.

- Hiding the "Gol" (hiding team):

A designated player from the hiding team secretly shuffles the "gol" between their own hands or among the hands of other team members.

The goal is for the opposing team to be unable to determine which hand the "gol" is in. This shuffling is usually done with rapid hand movements, twists, and attempts to deceive the opponent.

- Guessing the "Gol" (guessing team):

The opposing team (the guessing team) must carefully observe the movements and facial expressions of the opposing players and guess which hand the "gol" is hidden in.

The guessing team can declare hands that they believe are "pooch" (empty) as "pooch" (i.e., they eliminate them from consideration). Typically, in each round, the guessing team can declare up to three "pooch" hands.

=== Modern versions with cards ===
Nowadays, commercial and modern versions of "Gol ya Pooch" have become more complex and exciting with the addition of tactical cards and new rules. These cards have special abilities that can change the flow of the game, such as:

Duel card: The player holding the "gol" reveals it and enters a one-on-one competition with an opposing player.

Antenna card: The guessing team can ask the opposing team a question, and the opponent must respond with a "yes" or "no."

Empty play vard: The opposing team must perform three more empty hand movements.

== Scoring ==
If the guessing team correctly finds the "gol": The game proceeds in their favor, and it becomes their turn to hide the "gol."

If the guessing team finds the "gol" without any "pooch" declarations (on the first correct guess): They usually earn 2 points.

If the guessing team finds the "gol" after declaring some "pooch" hands: They take possession of the "gol," and it becomes their turn, but they receive no points (or fewer points).

If the guessing team fails to find the "gol" (all three guesses are "pooch"): One point is awarded to the team that hid the "gol," and they retain the turn to hide the "gol."

=== Shah Gol (King Gol) ===
In more modern versions of the game, when one team approaches winning (e.g., 8 out of 9 points), the "Shah Gol" phase begins. In this phase, specific rules apply to finding the "gol," and usually, if the guessing team correctly finds the "Shah Gol," they earn more points or points are deducted from the opposing team.

== Educational and developmental aspects ==
Gol ya Pooch is not just an entertainment; it also helps in developing mental and social skills:

- Observation and awareness: Players must pay close attention to the movements and body language of their opponents.
- Concentration: Maintaining focus throughout the game is crucial for discerning the location of the "gol."
- Analysis and strategy: Players must try to analyze the opponent's behavior and employ the best strategy for hiding or finding the "gol."
- Interaction and teamwork: In team games, coordination and cooperation among team members are vital for success.

Due to its simplicity in terms of required tools and rules, this game can be played anywhere and with any number of players, which is why it has always been well-received.
