= Flexor carpi radialis muscle =

Superficial muscle in the anterior side of the forearm

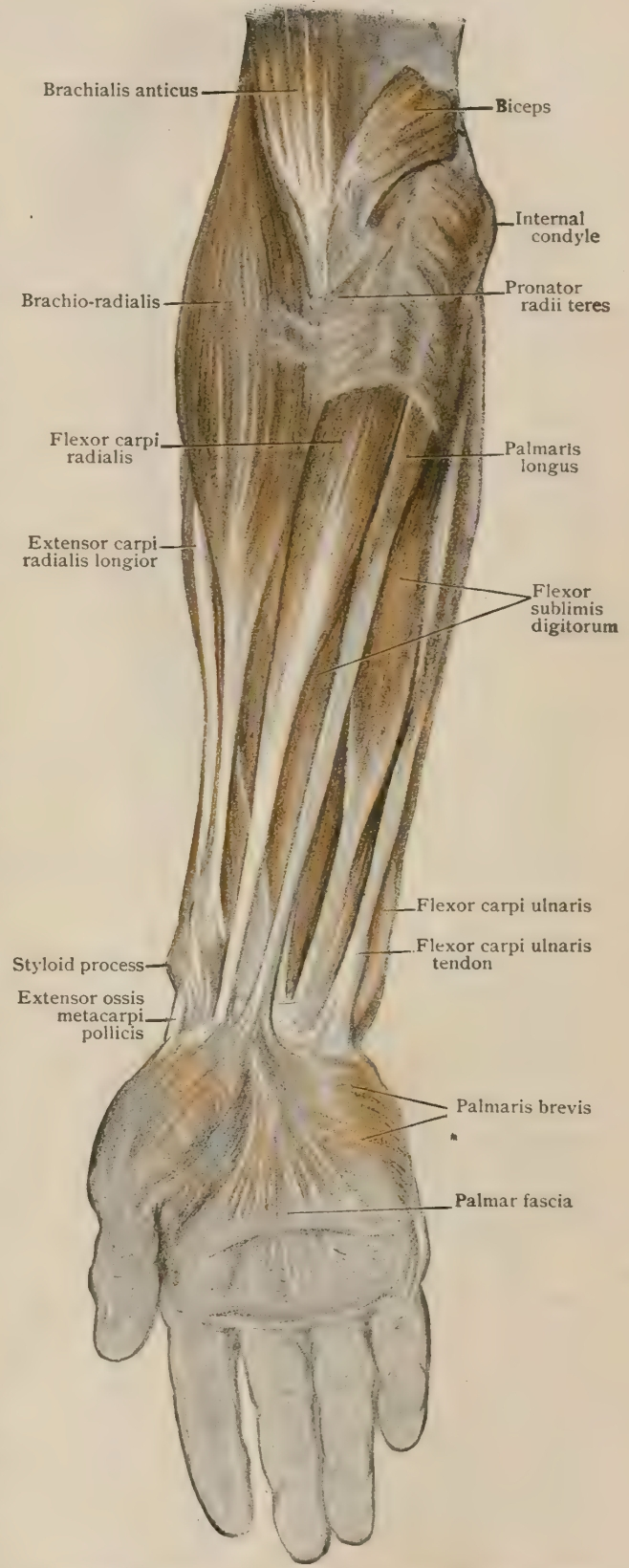
- Anterior view of the right forearm. Superficial muscles. Flexor carpi radialis is labeled at the upper left. (From Piersol's Anatomy.)

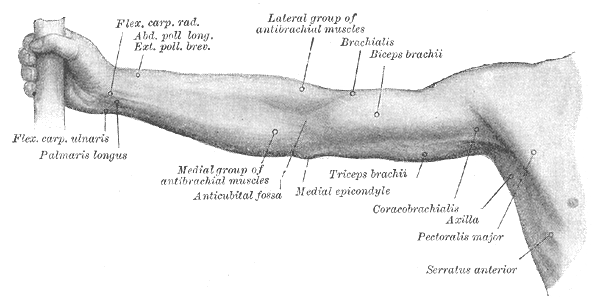
- Anterior view of right upper extremity. (Flex. carp. rad. labeled at upper left.)

Details
- Origin: Medial epicondyle of humerus (common flexor tendon)
- Insertion: Bases of second and third metacarpal bones
- Artery: Ulnar artery
- Nerve: Median nerve
- Actions: Flexion and abduction at wrist
- Antagonist: Extensor carpi ulnaris muscle

Identifiers
- Latin: musculus flexor carpi radialis
- TA98: A04.6.02.028
- TA2: 2481
- FMA: 38459

In anatomy, flexor carpi radialis is a muscle of the human forearm that acts to flex and (radially) abduct the hand. The Latin carpus means wrist; hence flexor carpi is a flexor of the wrist.

== Origin and insertion ==
The flexor carpi radialis is one of four muscles in the superficial layer of the anterior compartment of the forearm.

This muscle originates from the medial epicondyle of the humerus as part of the common flexor tendon. It runs just laterally of flexor digitorum superficialis and inserts on the anterior aspect of the base of the metacarpal of the index finger (second metacarpal), and has small slips to both the metacarpal of the middle finger (third metacarpal) and trapezium tuberosity.

The tendon of the flexor carpi radialis is visible on the anterior surface of the forearm, just proximal to the wrist, when the wrist is flexed. It is the tendon seen most lateral, closest to the thumb.

== Nerve and artery ==
Like most flexors of the anterior compartment of the forearm, FCR is innervated by the median nerve, specifically by axons from cervical nerve roots C6 and C7. The muscle receives its blood supply from the ulnar artery.

== Exercises ==
The muscle, like all flexors of the forearm, can be strengthened by exercises that resist its flexion. A wrist roller can be used, Zottman curls, and wrist curls with dumbbells can also be performed.

== See also ==
- Flexor retinaculum of the hand
- Flexor carpi ulnaris

== Additional images ==
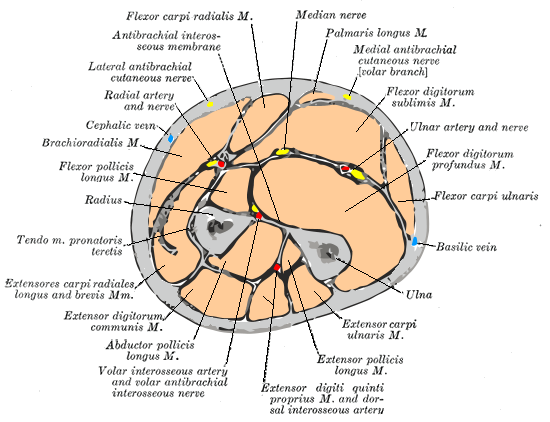
Cross-section through the middle of the right forearm.

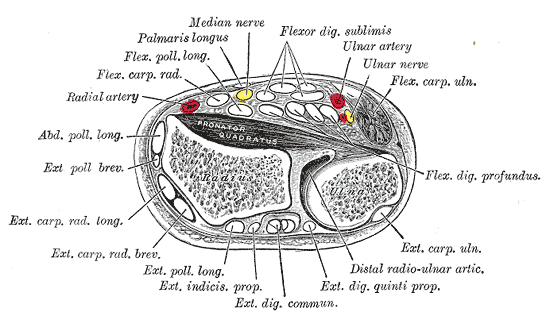
Transverse section across distal ends of radius and ulna. Right upper limb.

Transverse section across the right-sided wrist and digits.

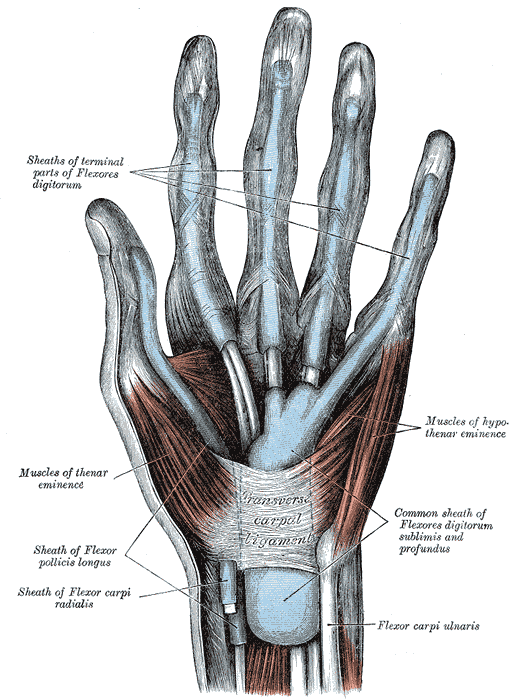
The mucous sheaths of the tendons on the front of the wrist and digits (left upper limb).

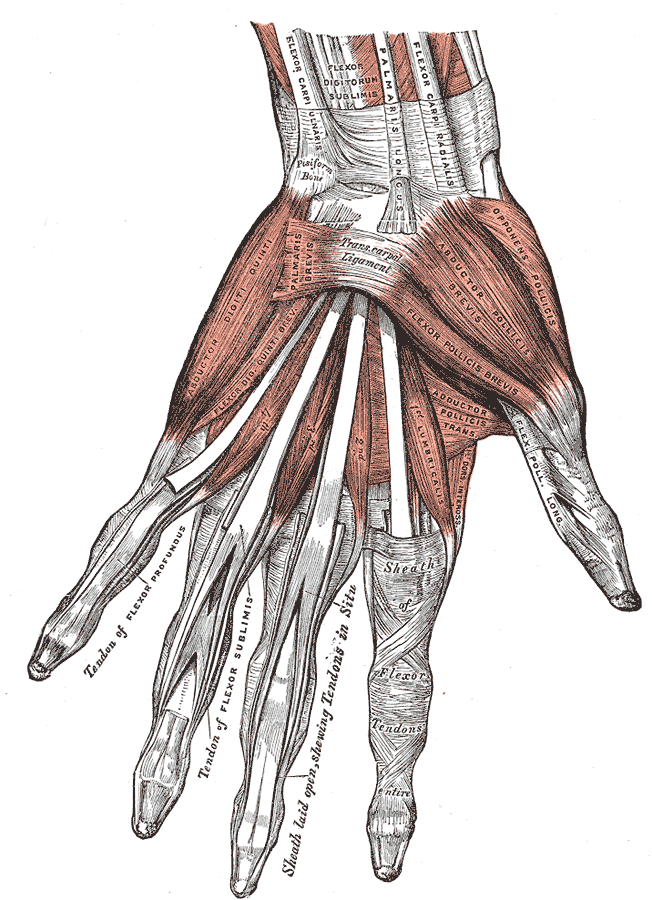
The muscles of the left hand. Palmar surface.

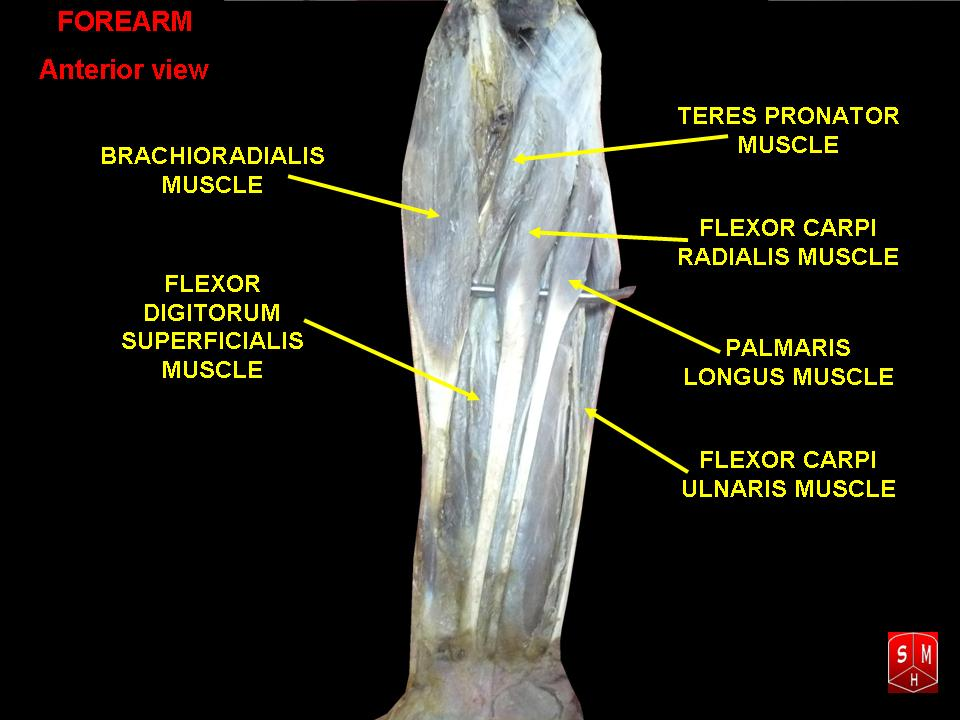
Flexor carpi radialis muscle (right upper limb)
