= Flexor carpi muscle =

Flexor carpi muscle may refer to:

- Flexor carpi radialis muscle
- Flexor carpi ulnaris muscle
