= Hand wrap =

Hand protection for boxing

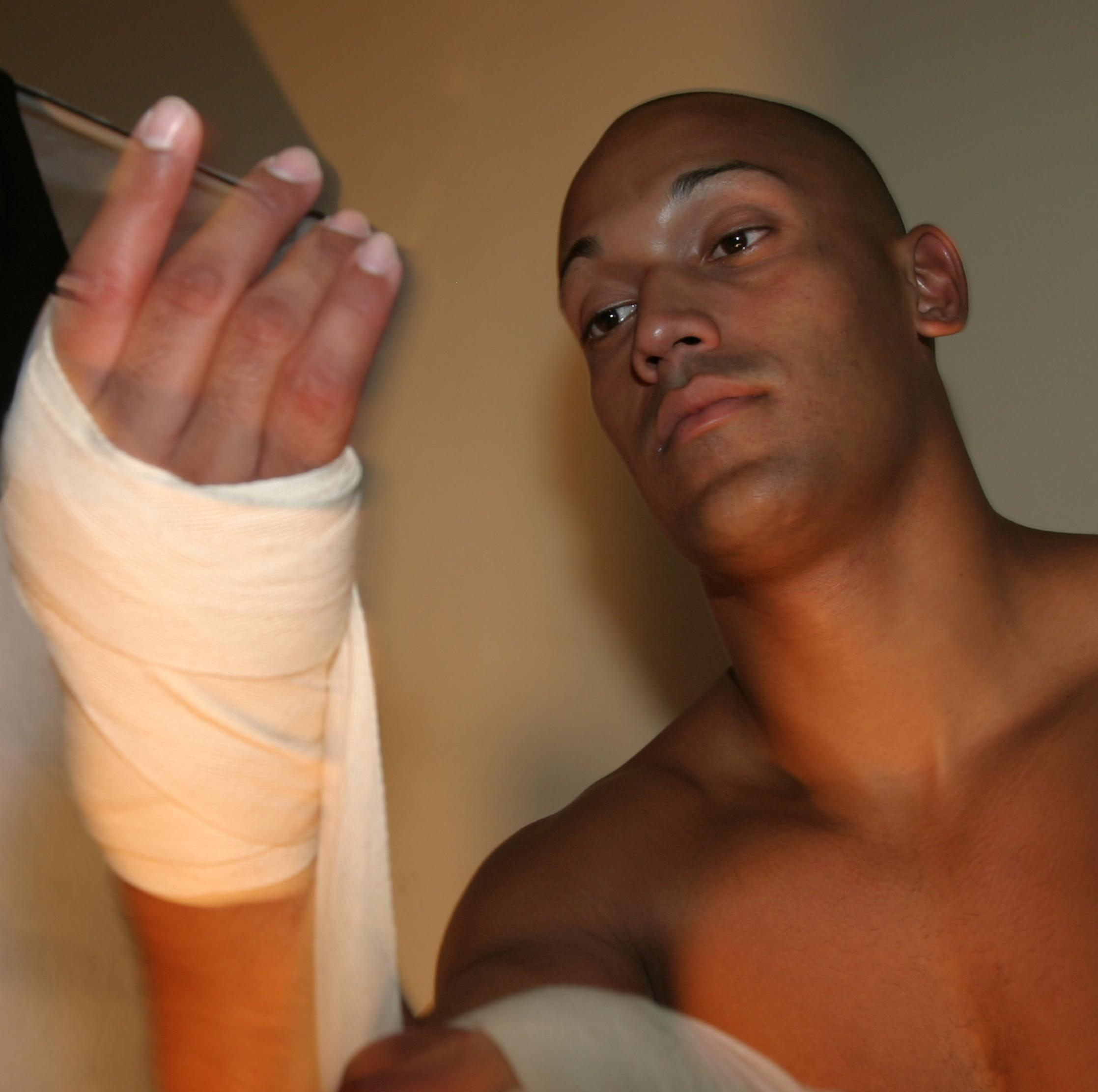
Hand wraps made of gauze and tape are frequently worn under boxing gloves for competition. This wrap primarily supports the wrist and knuckles, but each athlete has their own preference.

A hand wrap or wrist wrap is a strip of cloth used by boxers (and participants in other combat sports) to protect the hand and wrist against injuries induced by punching. It is wrapped securely around the wrist, the palm, and the base of the thumb, where it serves to both maintain the alignment of the joints, and to compress and lend strength to the soft tissues of the hand during the impact of a punch.

== Benefits ==
A hand wrap protects against several common types of boxing injuries. It typically supports the wrist joint, keeping the joint aligned when the impact of a punch is absorbed by the wrong part of the hand. It also secures the base of the thumb to the hand, thereby reducing the chance of a sprain or fracture that can result from the thumb striking an opponent's elbow. Most importantly, it significantly strengthens the metacarpus, reducing the likelihood of a fracture of one of the metacarpal bones. Such a fracture is often called the boxer's fracture—which is usually a fracture in the neck of the fourth or fifth metacarpal—because of its frequency among fighters.

Hand and wrist wraps are used to compress (and keep compressed when hitting) the bones and tissues in the hand. Such compression allows boxers to hit with greater force than if they did not use them. Boxers claim they feel less pain when hitting so their opponent may feel more pain.

== Wrapping method ==
Each sportsperson, cornerman, or cutman has a preferred wrapping method based on the situation and experience. Variations can produce more wrist support, thumb and pinky support, padding for the knuckles, or less fabric within the fist. A single wrap between fingers over the finger web helps stabilize the wrap and keep it from falling apart within a looser-fitting glove. Competition rules may restrict the type and amount of material used, giving each fighter a limited amount of gauze and tape which may be divided and rolled in various ways for a particular fighter or match.

== Material ==
Training wraps are usually reusable cloth and may be secured with a small tie tab or with velcro. Conventional hand wraps are non-elastic. Mexican-style hand wraps are slightly elasticized and are popular with many boxers. The length of wraps will vary depending on rules, personal preference, hand size and the type of glove to be worn, with shorter wraps common for fingerless "grappling gloves" used in mixed martial arts.

A new alternative to hand wraps are foam or gel-lined fingerless gloves worn inside any boxing glove; these can be used to reduce and prevent harm to the hands and head for bag work, sparring, or competition depending on the rules of the governing organization. However, the durability of this version is sacrificed for efficiency.
