= Metacarpal bones =

Bones of hand

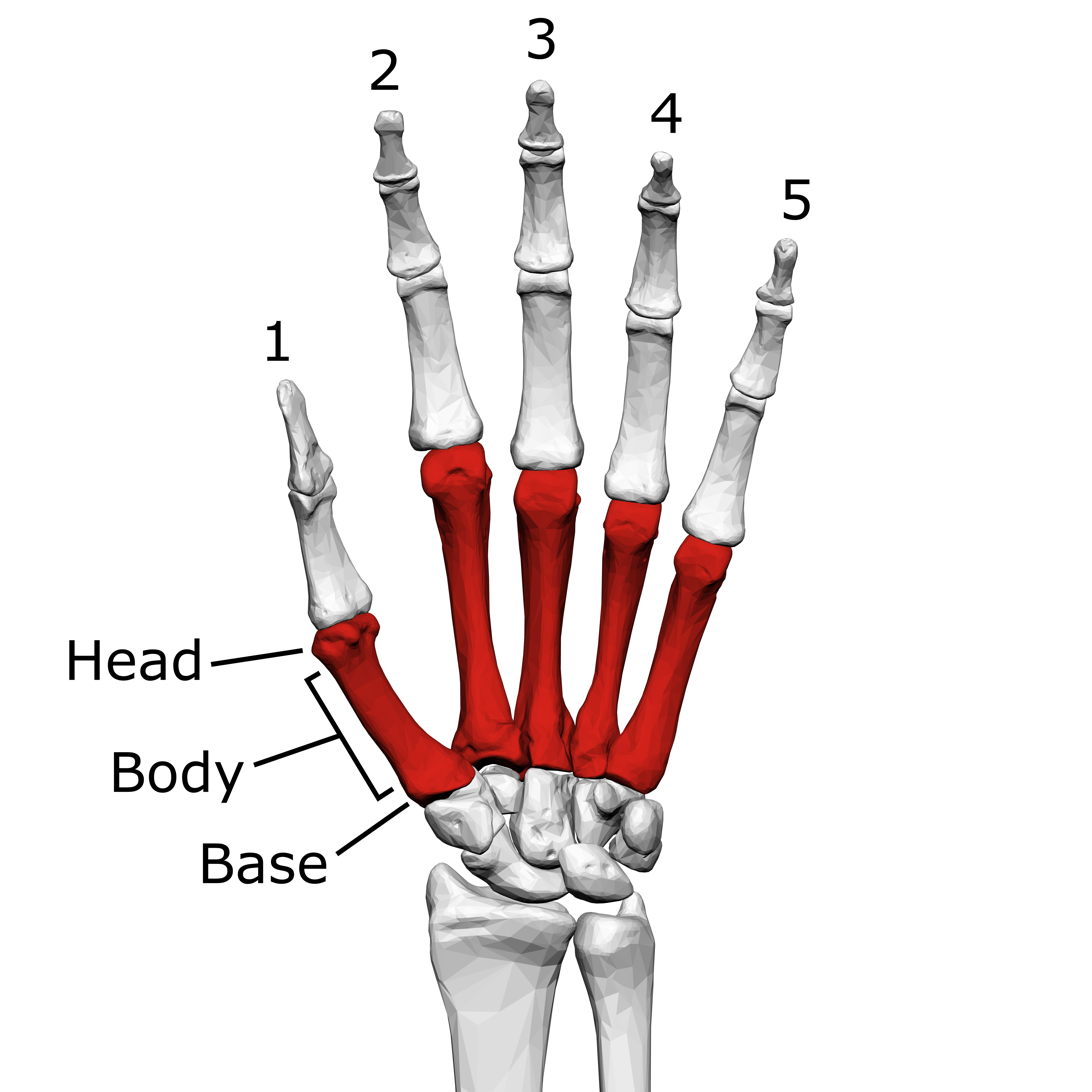
- Metacarpals shown in red. Left hand, anterior (palmar) view.

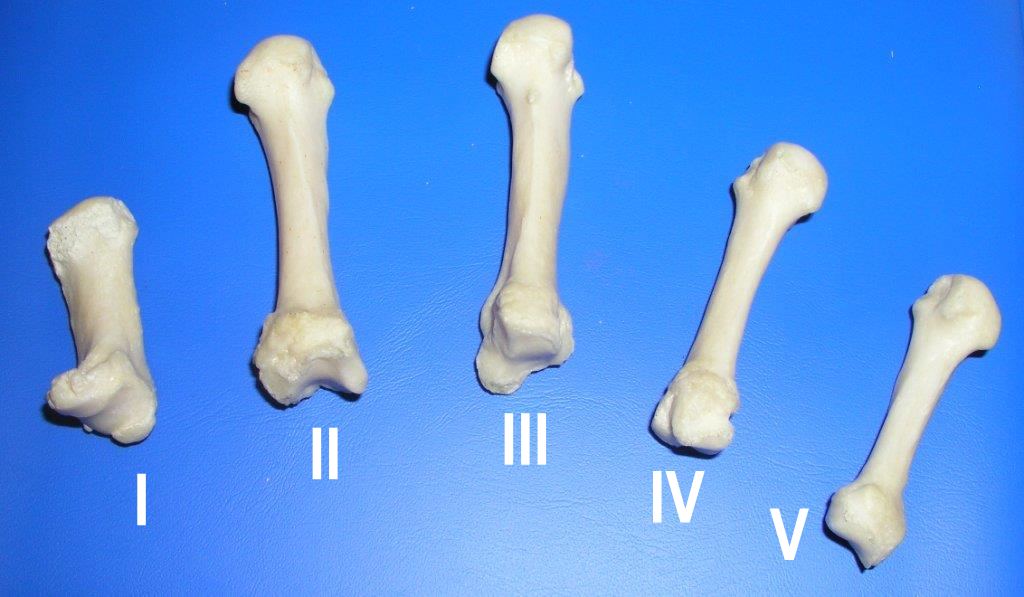
- The five metacarpal bones, numbered. Left hand, anterior (palmar) view. os primum metacarpale / os metacarpale I os secundum metacarpale / os metacarpale II os tertium metacarpale / os metacarpale III os quartum metacarpale / os metacarpale IV os quintum metacarpale / os metacarpale V

Details
- Origins: Carpal bones of wrist
- Insertions: Proximal phalanges
- Articulations: Carpometacarpal, intermetacarpal, metacarpophalangeal

Identifiers
- Latin: os metacarpale pl. ossa metacarpalia
- MeSH: D050279
- TA98: A02.4.09.001
- TA2: 1264
- FMA: 9612

In human anatomy, the metacarpal bones, or "palm bones", collectively the metacarpus, are the appendicular bones that form the intermediate part of the hand between the phalanges (fingers) and the carpal bones (wrist bones), which articulate with the forearm. The metacarpal bones are homologous to the metatarsal bones in the foot.

== Structure ==
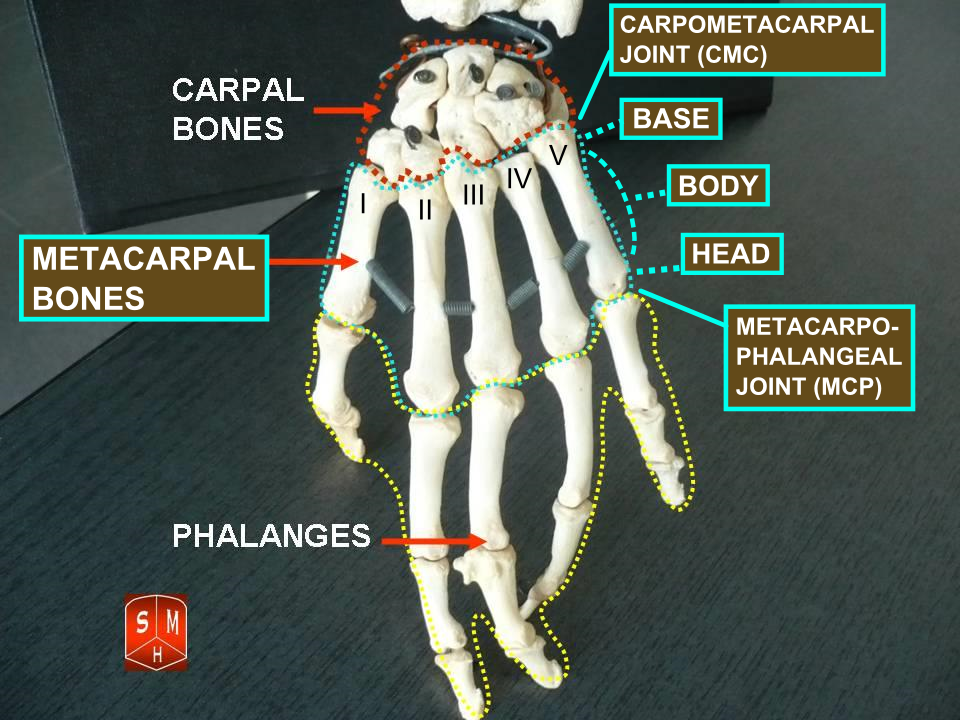
Left hand shown with thumb on left.

The metacarpals form a transverse arch to which the rigid row of distal carpal bones are fixed. The peripheral metacarpals (those of the thumb and little finger) form the sides of the cup of the palmar gutter and as they are brought together they deepen this concavity. The index metacarpal is the most firmly fixed, while the thumb metacarpal articulates with the trapezium and acts independently from the others. The middle metacarpals are tightly united to the carpus by intrinsic interlocking bone elements at their bases. The ring metacarpal is somewhat more mobile while the fifth metacarpal is semi-independent.

Each metacarpal bone consists of a body or shaft, and two extremities; the head at the distal or digital end (near the fingers), and the base at the proximal or carpal end (close to the wrist).

=== Body ===
The body (shaft) is prismoid in form, and curved, so as to be convex in the longitudinal direction behind, concave in front. It presents three surfaces: medial, lateral, and dorsal.

- The medial and lateral surfaces are concave, for the attachment of the interosseus muscles, and separated from one another by a prominent anterior ridge.
- The dorsal surface presents in its distal two-thirds a smooth, triangular, flattened area which is covered in by the tendons of the extensor muscles. This surface is bounded by two lines, which commence in small tubercles situated on either side of the digital extremity, and, passing upward, converge and meet some distance above the center of the bone and form a ridge which runs along the rest of the dorsal surface to the carpal extremity. This ridge separates two sloping surfaces for the attachment of the interossei dorsales.
- To the tubercles on the digital extremities are attached the collateral ligaments of the metacarpophalangeal joints.

=== Base ===
The base (basis) or carpal extremity is of a cuboidal form, and broader behind than in front. It articulates with the carpal bones and with the adjoining metacarpal bones while its dorsal and volar surfaces are rough, for the attachment of ligaments.

=== Head ===
The head (caput) or digital extremity presents an oblong surface markedly convex from before backward, less so transversely, and flattened from side to side; it articulates with the proximal phalanx. It is broader, and extends farther upward, on the volar than on the dorsal aspect, and is longer in the antero-posterior than in the transverse diameter. On either side of the head is a tubercle for the attachment of the collateral ligament of the metacarpophalangeal joint.

The dorsal surface, broad and flat, supports the tendons of the extensor muscles.

The volar surface is grooved in the middle line for the passage of the flexor tendons, and marked on either side by an articular eminence continuous with the terminal articular surface.

=== Neck ===
The neck, or subcapital segment, is the transition zone between the body and the head.

=== Articulations ===
Besides the metacarpophalangeal joints, the metacarpal bones articulate by carpometacarpal joints as follows:

1. the first with the trapezium;
2. the second with the trapezium, trapezoid, capitate and third metacarpal;
3. the third with the capitate and second and fourth metacarpals;
4. the fourth with the capitate, hamate, and third and fifth metacarpals;
5. and the fifth with the hamate and fourth metacarpal;
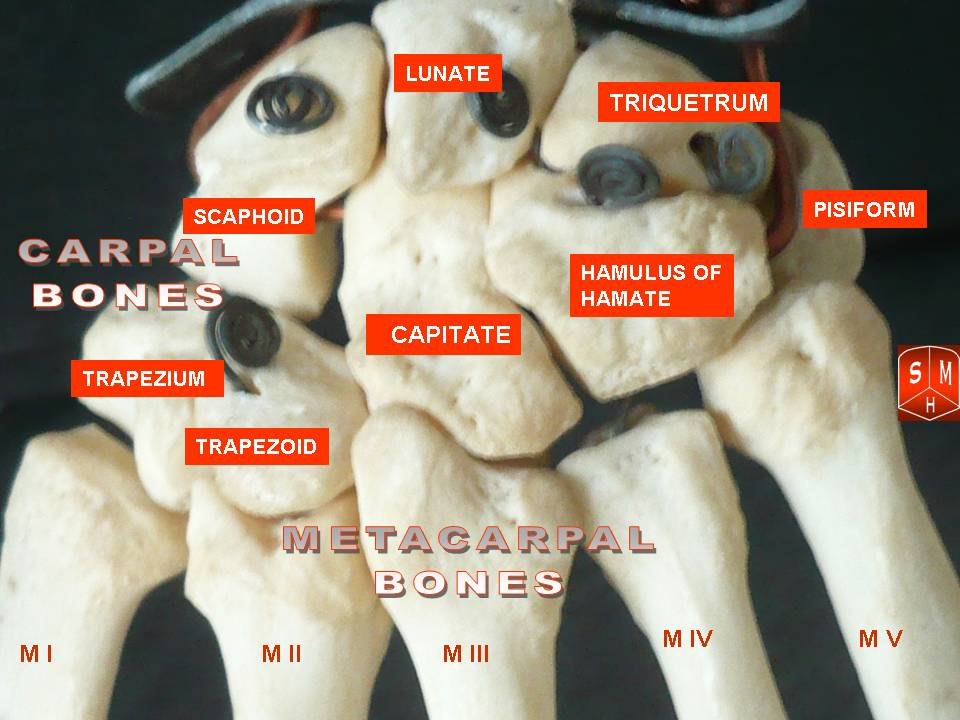
Carpometacarpal joints of the left hand. Thumb on left.

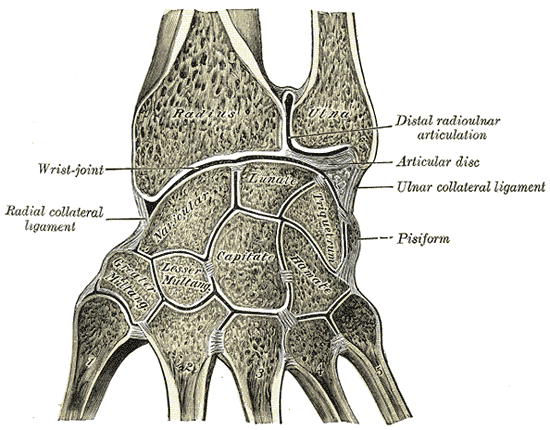
Carpometacarpal joints of the left hand. Thumb on left.

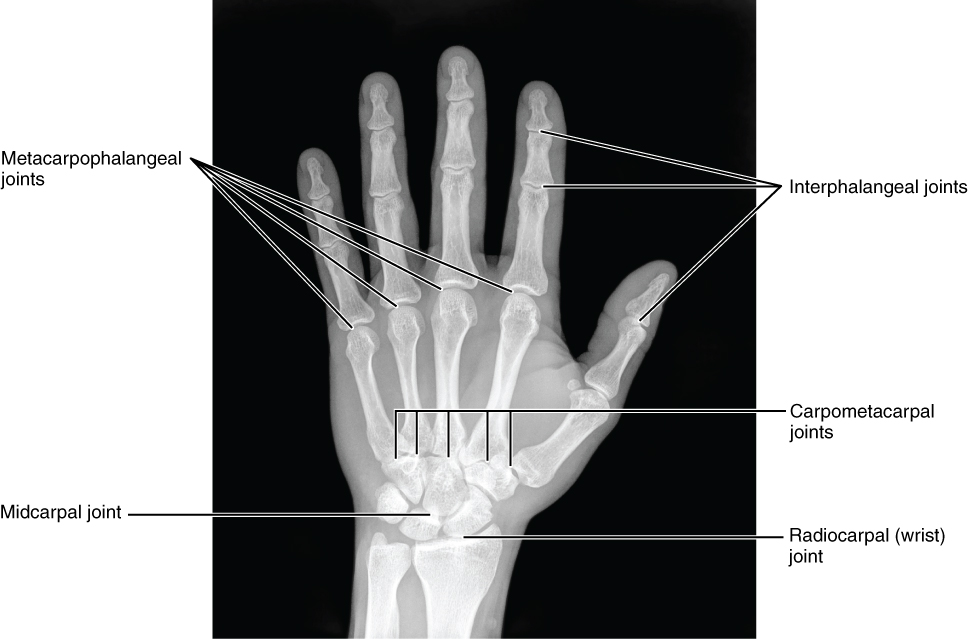
X-ray

=== Insertions ===
Extensor Carpi Radialis Longus/Brevis: Both insert on the base of metacarpal II; Assist with wrist extension and radial flexion of the wrist

Extensor Carpi Ulnaris: Inserts on the base of metacarpal V; Extends and fixes wrist when digits are being flexed; assists with ulnar flexion of wrist

Abductor Pollicis Longus: Inserts on the trapezium and base of metacarpal I; Abducts thumb in frontal plane; extends thumb at carpometacarpal joint

Opponens Pollicis: Inserts on metacarpal I; flexes metacarpal I to oppose the thumb to the fingertips

Opponens digiti minimi: Inserts on the medial surface of metacarpal V; Flexes metacarpal V at carpometacarpal joint when little finger is moved into opposition with tip of thumb; deepens palm of hand.

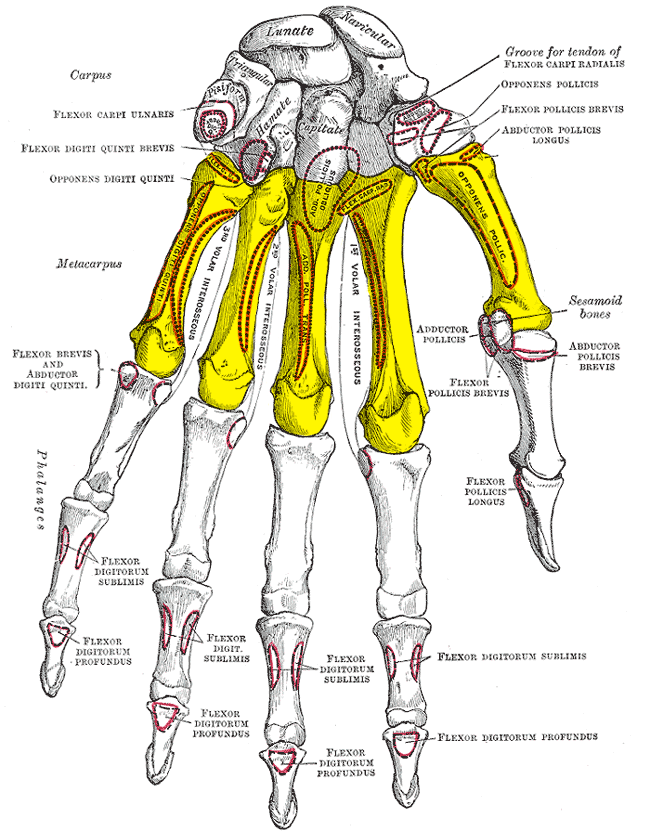
Metacarpus (yellow). Insertions are shown in red. Left hand, anterior (palmar) view.

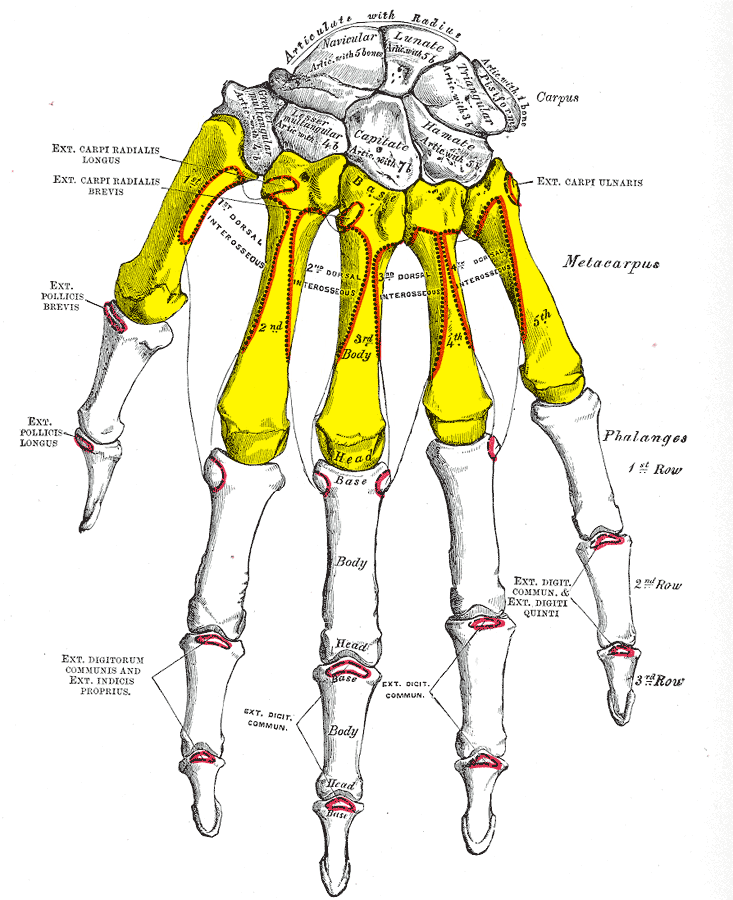
Metacarpus (yellow). Insertions are shown in red. Left hand, posterior (dorsal) view.

== Clinical significance ==
=== Congenital disorders ===
The fourth and fifth metacarpal bones are commonly "blunted" or shortened, in pseudohypoparathyroidism and pseudopseudohypoparathyroidism.

A blunted fourth metacarpal, with normal fifth metacarpal, can signify Turner syndrome.

Blunted metacarpals (particularly the fourth metacarpal) are a symptom of nevoid basal-cell carcinoma syndrome.

=== Fracture ===
The neck of the fifth metacarpal is a common location for a boxer's fracture, but all parts of a metacarpal bone (including head, body and base) are susceptible to fracture. During their lifetime, 2.5% of individuals will experience at least one metacarpal fracture. Bennett's fracture (base of the thumb) is the most common. Several types of treatment exist ranging from non-operative techniques, with or without immobilization, to operative techniques using closed or open reduction and internal fixation (ORIF). Generally, most fractures showing little or no displacement can be treated successfully without surgery. Intraarticular fracture-dislocations of the metacarpal head or base may require surgical fixation, as fragment displacement affecting the joint surface is rarely tolerated well.

== Other animals ==
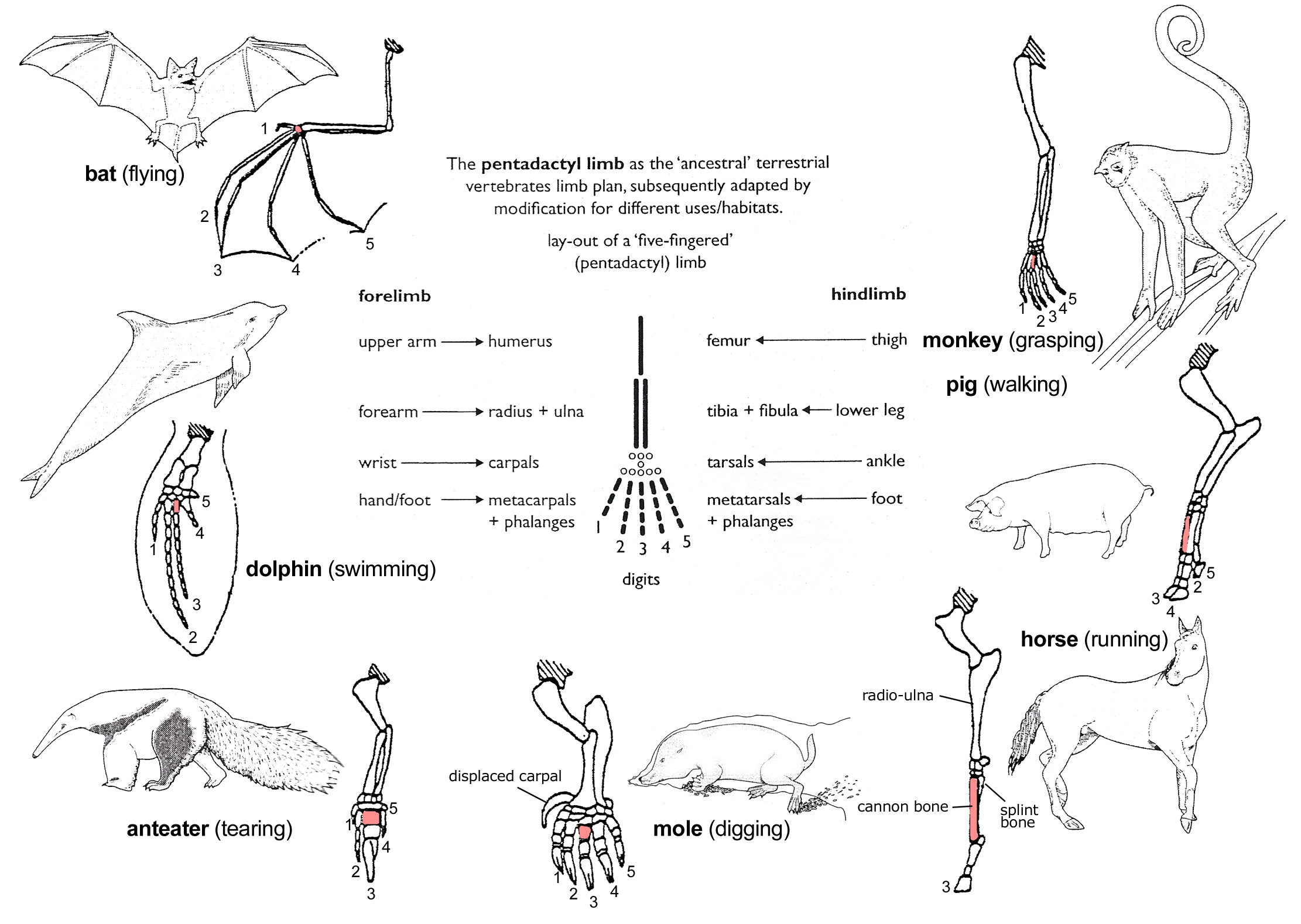
The principle of homology illustrated by the adaptive radiation of the metacarpal bones of mammals. All conform to the basic pentadactyl pattern but are modified for different usages. The third metacarpal is shaded throughout; the shoulder is crossed-hatched.

In four-legged animals, the metacarpals form part of the forefeet, and are frequently reduced in number, appropriate to the number of toes. In digitigrade and unguligrade animals, the metacarpals are greatly extended and strengthened, forming an additional segment to the limb, a feature that typically enhances the animal's speed. In both birds and bats, the metacarpals form part of the wing.

== History ==
=== Etymology ===
The Greek physician Galen used to refer to the metacarpus as μετακάρπιον. The Latin form metacarpium more truly resembles its Ancient Greek predecessor μετακάρπιον than metacarpus. Meta– is Greek for beyond and carpal from Ancient Greek καρπός (karpós, "wrist"). In anatomic Latin, adjectives like metacarpius, metacarpicus, metacarpiaeus, metacarpeus, metacarpianus and metacarpalis can be found. The form metacarpius is more true to the later Greek form μετακάρπιος. Metacarpalis, as in ossa metacarpalia in the current official Latin nomenclature, Terminologia Anatomica is a compound consisting of Latin and Greek parts. The usage of such hybrids in anatomic Latin is disapproved by some.

== Additional images ==
Metacarpus of the left hand (shown in red). Animation.

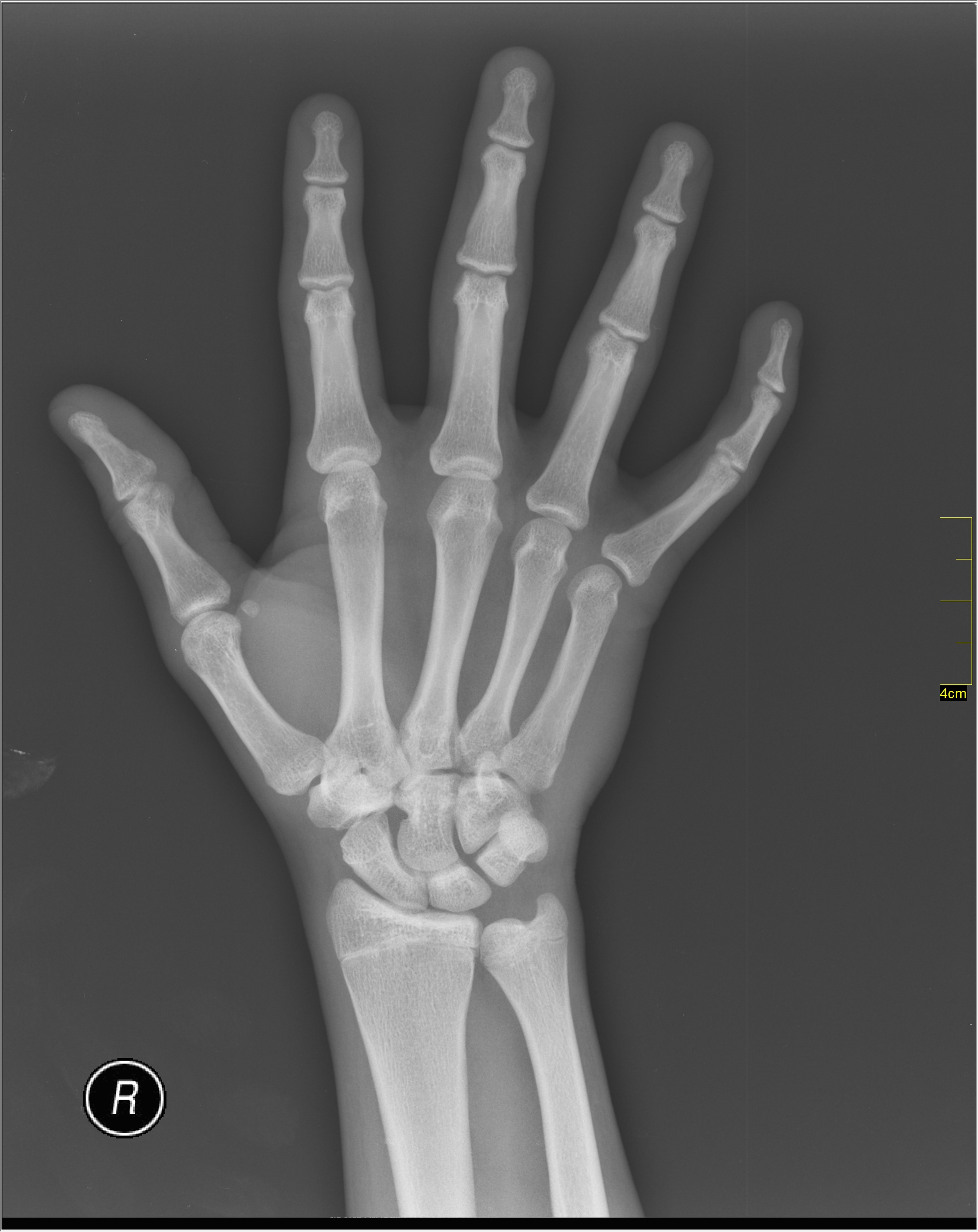
X-ray image of right hand with thumb on left.

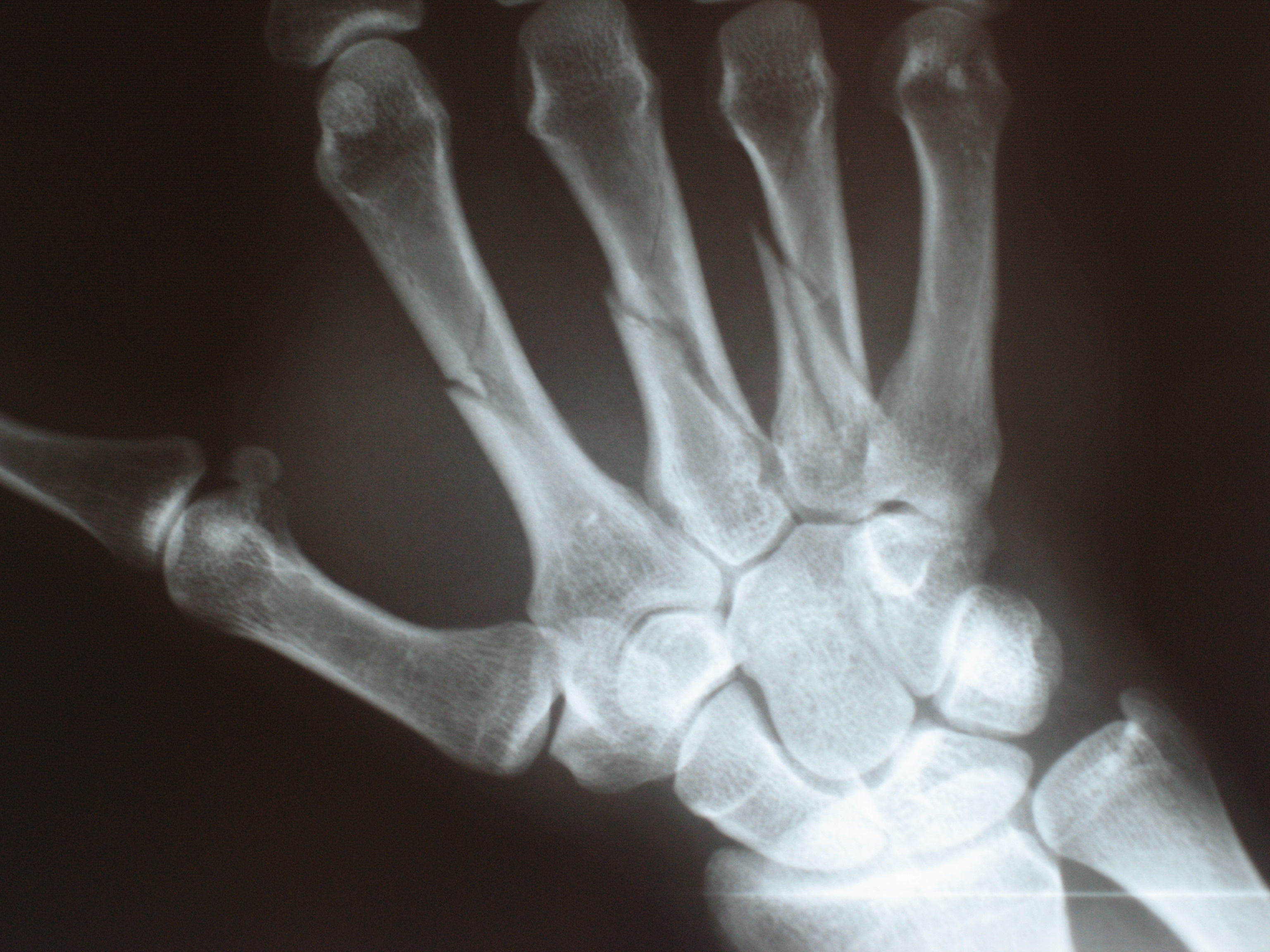
Multiple fractures of the metacarpals (aka broken hand). (Right hand shown with thumb on left.)

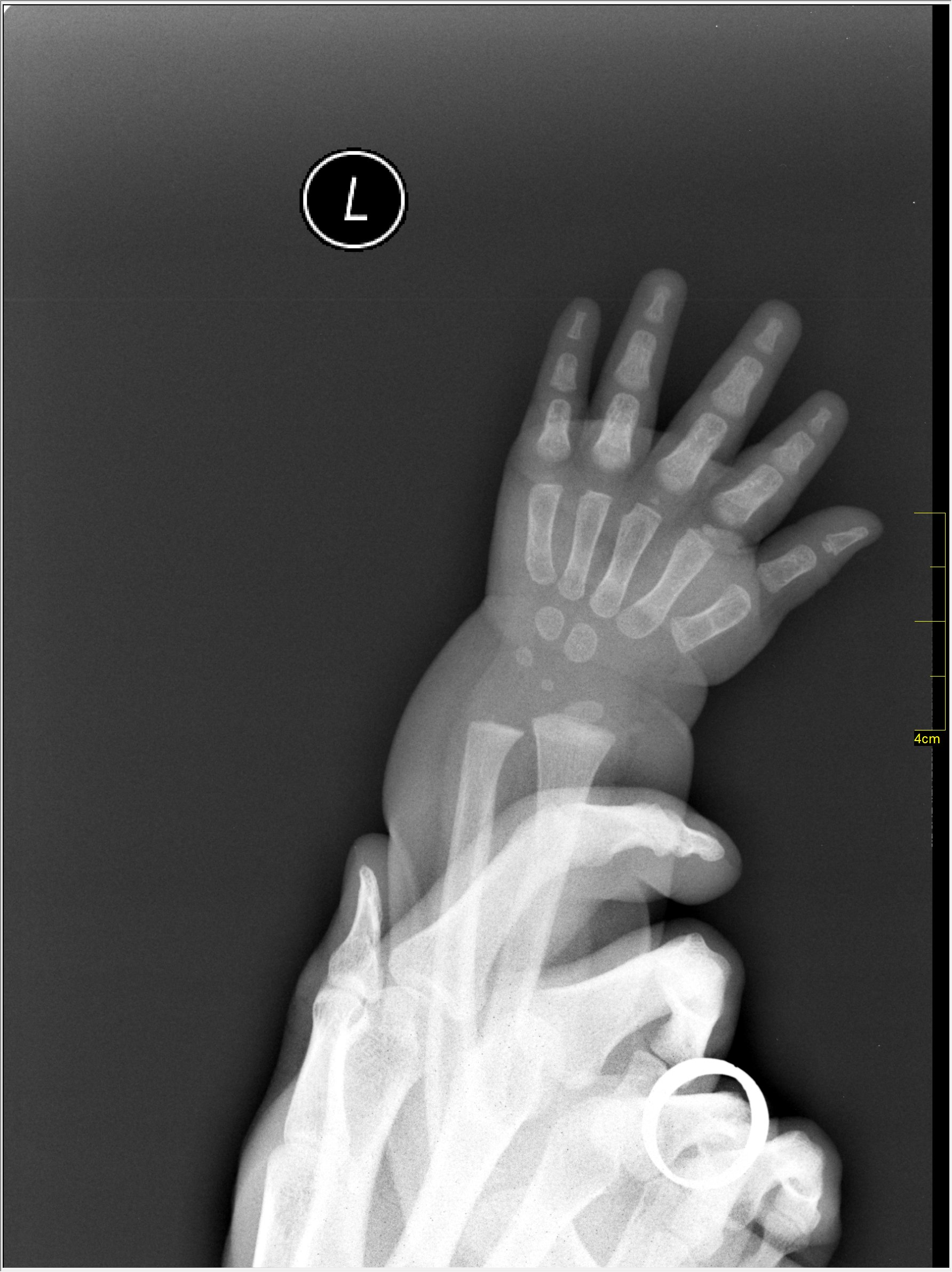
X-ray image of human infant left hand.

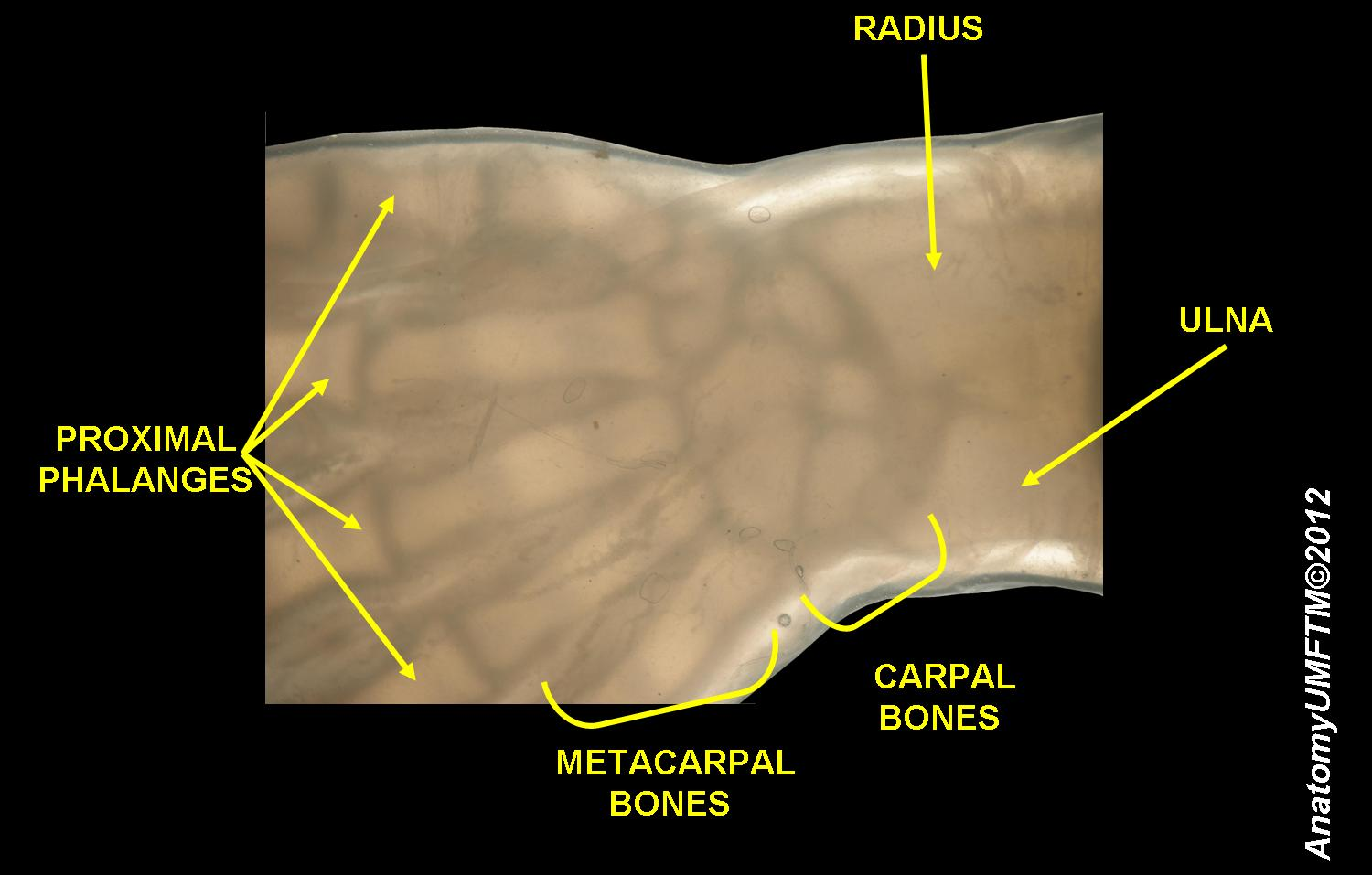
Micro-radiography of 8 weeks human embryo hand

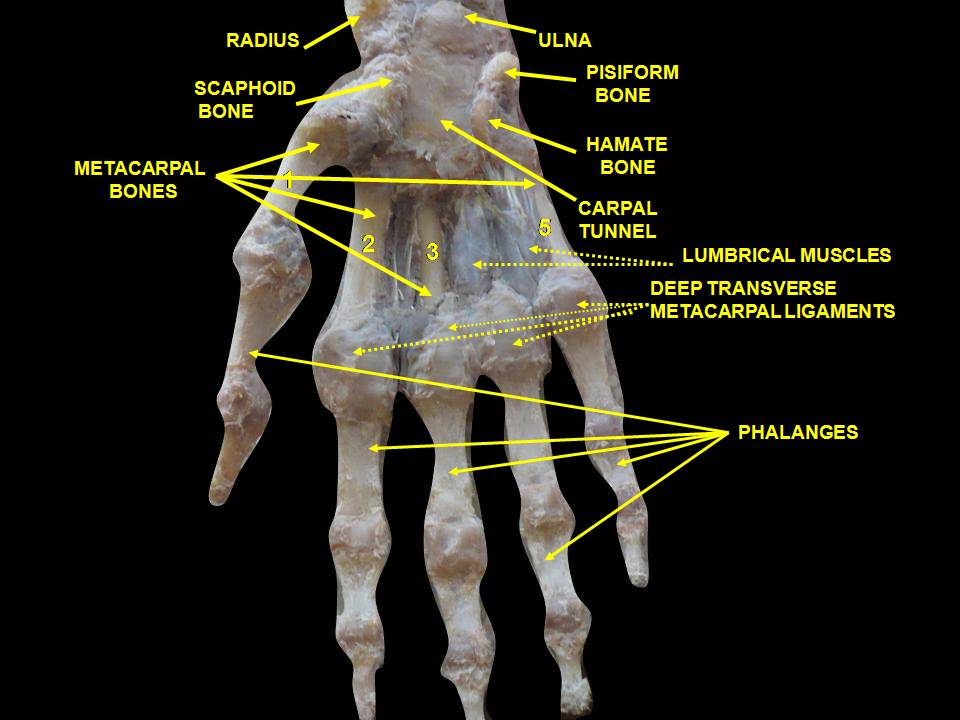
Right hand. Deep dissection. Anterior (palmar) view.

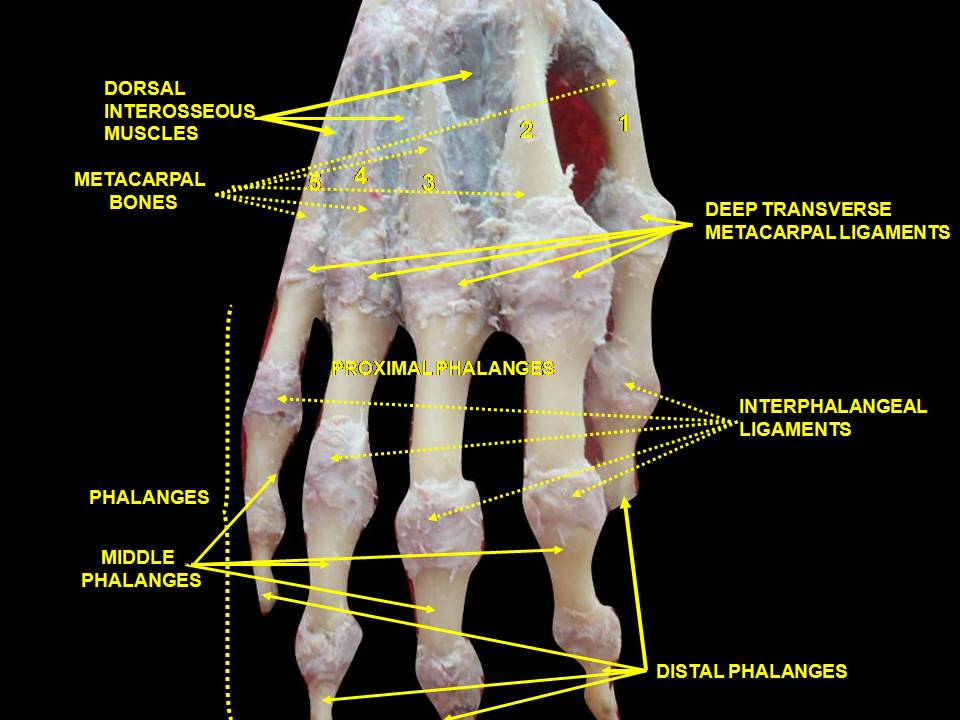
Right hand. Deep dissection. Posterior (dorsal) view.

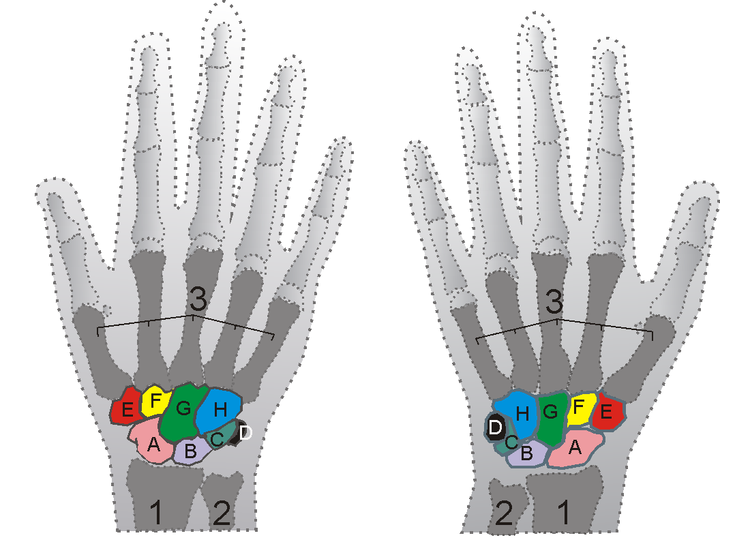
Bones of the hand, being the metacarpus labeled with number 3.

== See also ==
- Metacarpal synostosis
- Carpometacarpal bossing
