= Third metacarpal styloid process =

Hand bone

The third metacarpal styloid process enables the hand bone to lock into the wrist bones, allowing for greater amounts of pressure to be applied to the wrist and hand from a grasping thumb and fingers. It allows humans the dexterity and strength to make and use complex tools. This unique anatomical feature separates humans from apes and other nonhuman primates, and is not seen in human fossils older than 1.8 million years.
