= Fist =

Hand wherein all fingers are folded into palms firmly

Human fist from four different sides

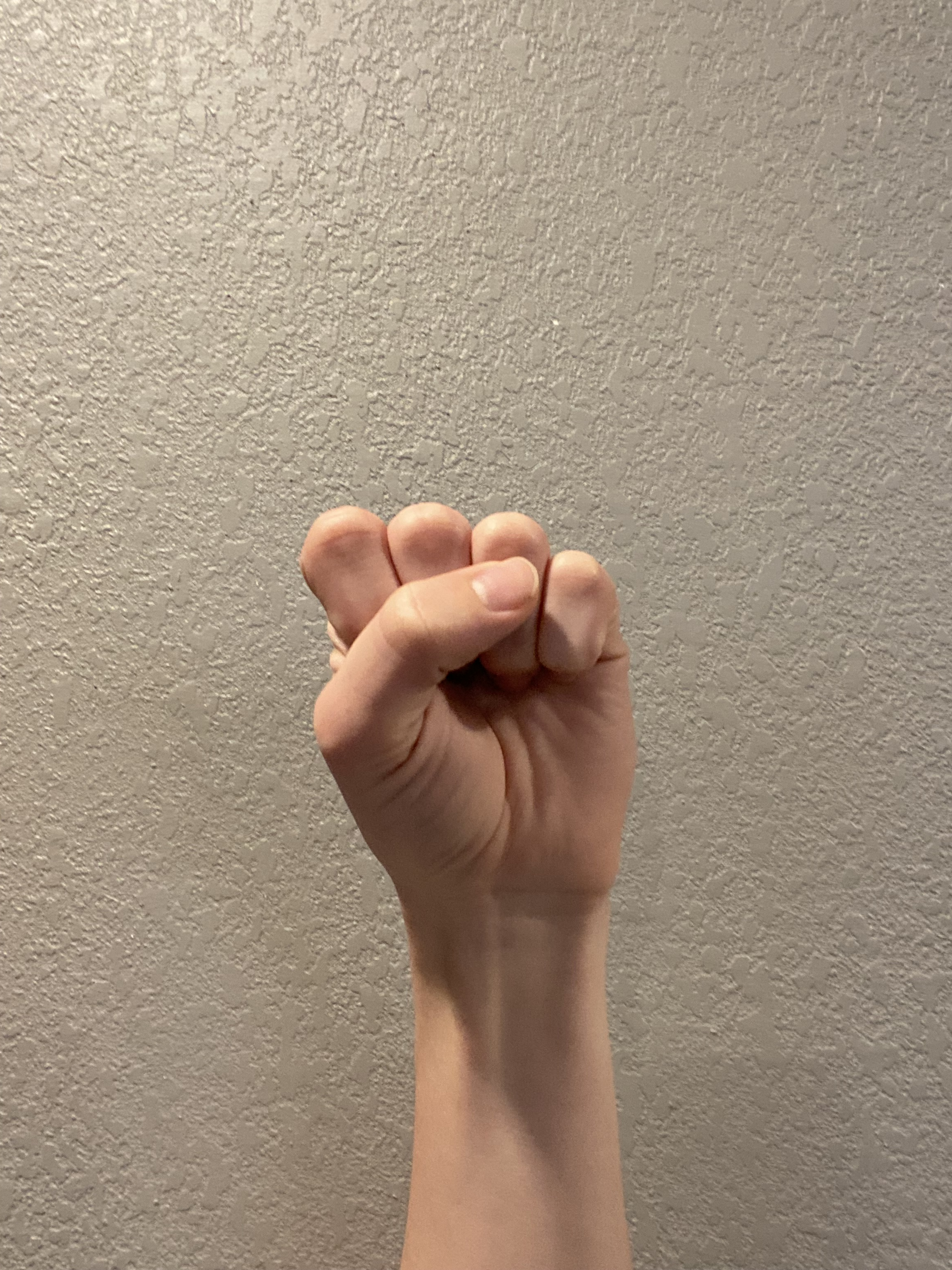
Closed fist

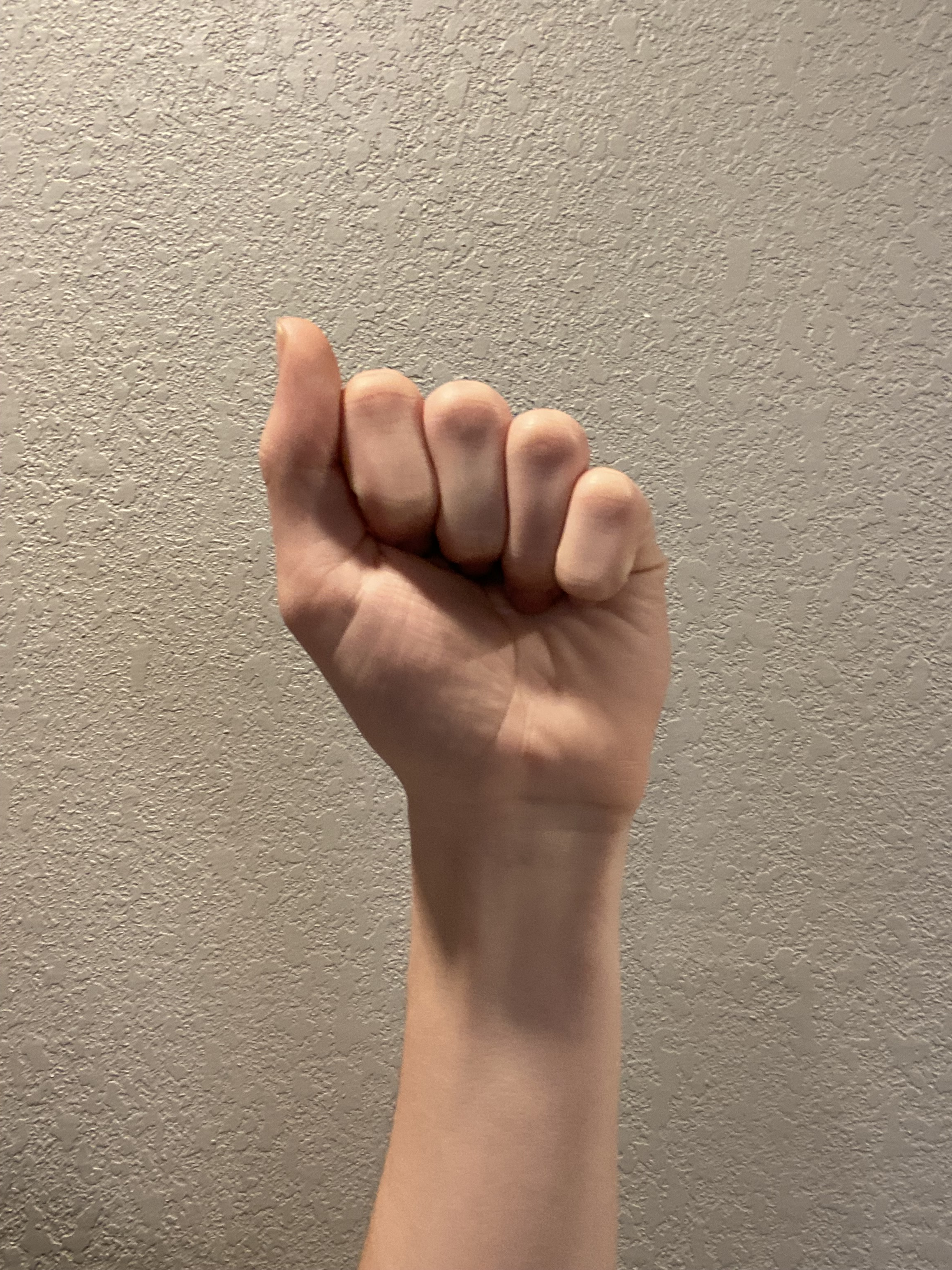
Open fist

A fist is the shape of a hand when the fingers are bent inward against the palm and held there tightly. To make or clench a fist is to fold the fingers tightly into the center of the palm and then to clamp the thumb over the middle phalanges; in contrast to this "closed" fist, one keeps the fist "open" by holding the thumb against the side of the index finger. One uses the closed fist to punch the lower phalanges against a surface, or to pound with the little-finger side of the hand's heel; one uses the open fist to knock with the middle knuckle of the middle finger.

Speakers of some English dialects may use the word "nieve" or "neef" to refer to a fist.

== Physiology and neurology ==
Making a fist is virtually unknown among other primates. This is because while "most primate hands are long of palm and finger [and] short of thumb", the proportions are the opposite for humans.

At least one study has claimed that the clenching of one's fist can be used to recall information.

Some studies have shown that making fists can help humans to cope with stress or anxiety because the mind gets preoccupied with the tightening of the muscle to focus on the issue at hand.

== Boxing ==
Formation of a fist for the purpose of punching is the most basic knowledge taught in the sport of boxing. Fists are taught in martial arts like karate, kung fu, and taekwondo for the process of punching and striking. Fight 100% says "more than 90% of the people actually don't know how to make a fist correctly", and adds that correct formation means the user "won't break [their] hand", "won't strain their wrist", will "be able to launch very powerful punches", and "be able to knock someone out in one punch".

Improper formation of the fist while punching or striking an object can cause bruising and broken small bones in the hand known as Boxer's fracture. Boxer's Fracture occurs when metacarpals or small bones in the hand break on the side of the pinky and ring finger. The name derives from the fact that such injuries are most common in boxers and practitioners of other fighting arts.

== Other uses ==
The raised fist is also a symbol of rebellion, militance, resistance and unity.

Various phenomena include the term "fist" in their name, such as the sexual act of fisting and the fist bump greeting.
