= Fourth metacarpal bone =

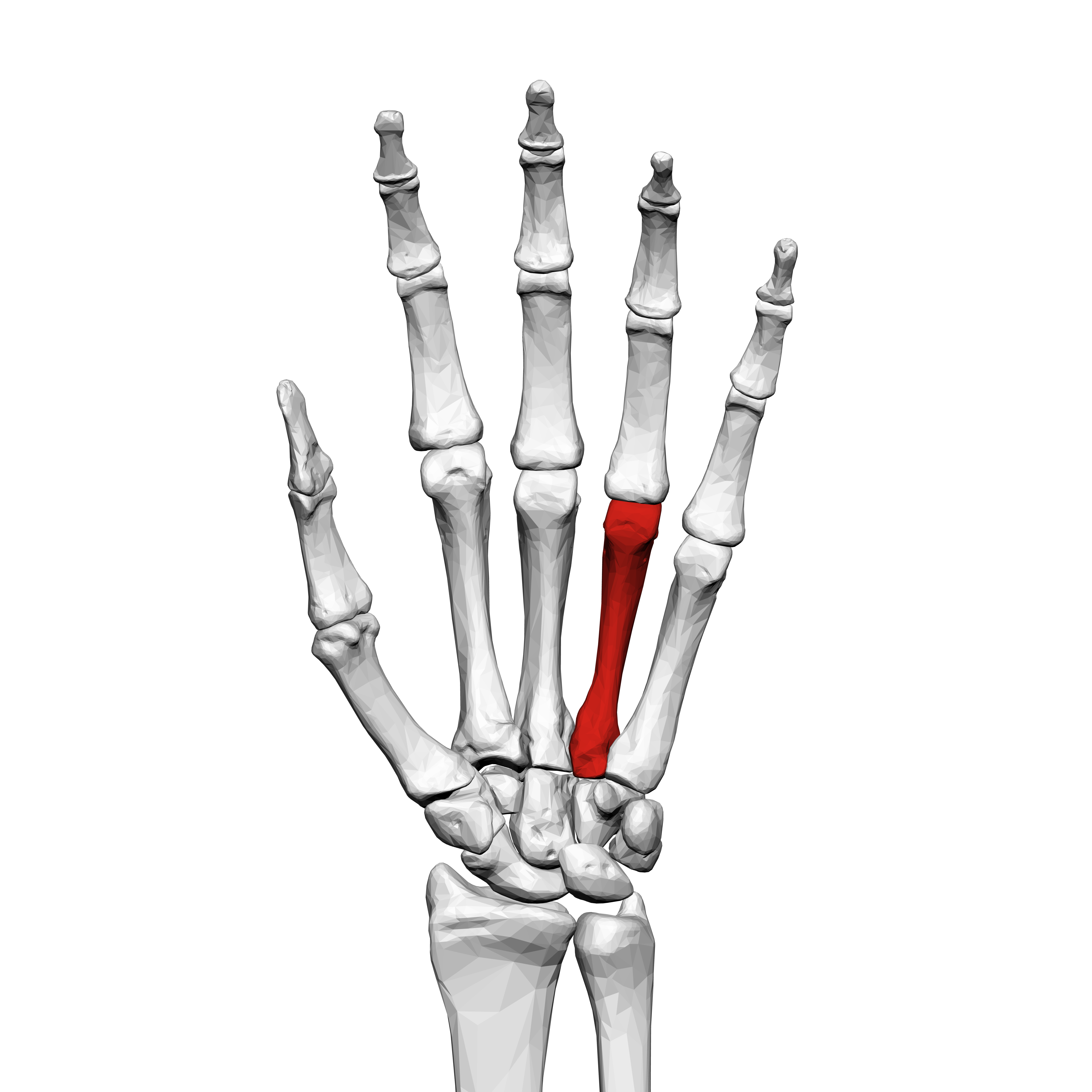
- Fourth metacarpal of the left hand (shown in red). Palmar view.

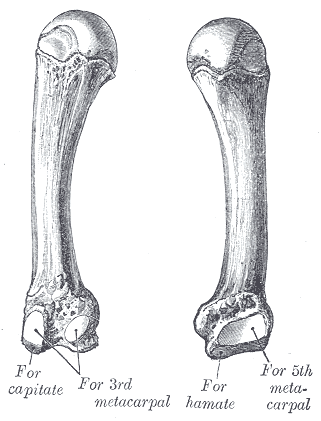
- The fourth metacarpal. (Left.)

Details

Identifiers
- Latin: os metacarpale IV
- FMA: 23902

The fourth metacarpal bone (metacarpal bone of the ring finger) is shorter and smaller than the third.

The base is small and quadrilateral; its superior surface presents two facets, a large one medially for articulation with the hamate, and a small one laterally for the capitate.

On the radial side are two oval facets, for articulation with the third metacarpal; and on the ulnar side a single concave facet, for the fifth metacarpal.

== Clinical relevance ==
A shortened fourth metacarpal bone can be a symptom of Kallmann syndrome, a genetic condition which results in the failure to commence or the non-completion of puberty. A short fourth metacarpal bone can also be found in Turner syndrome, a disorder involving sex chromosomes.

A fracture of the fourth and/or fifth metacarpal bones transverse neck secondary due to axial loading is known as a boxer's fracture.

== Ossification ==
The ossification process begins in the shaft during prenatal life, and in the head between 11th and 37th months.

== Additional images ==
Fourth metacarpal bone of the left hand (shown in red). Animation.

Fourth metacarpal bone of the left hand. Close up.

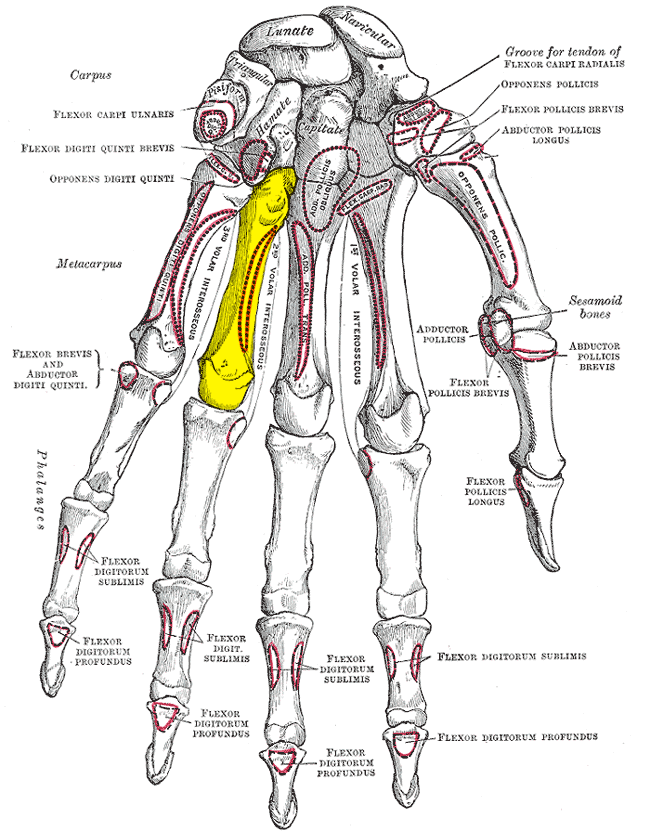
Palmar view of the left hand (fourth metacarpal shown in yellow).

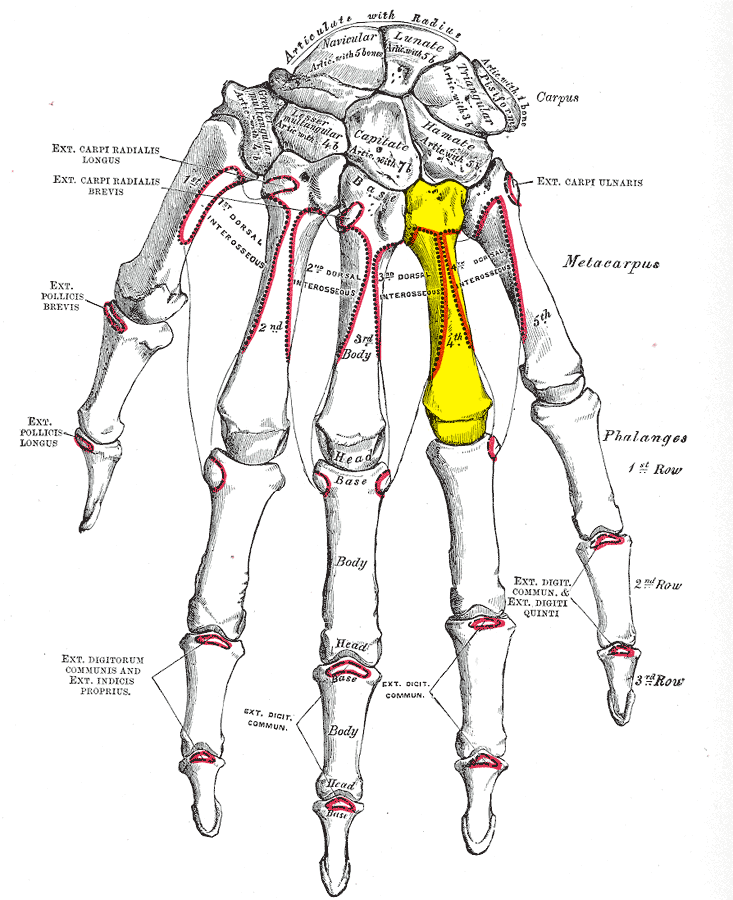
Dorsal view of the left hand (fourth metacarpal shown in yellow).

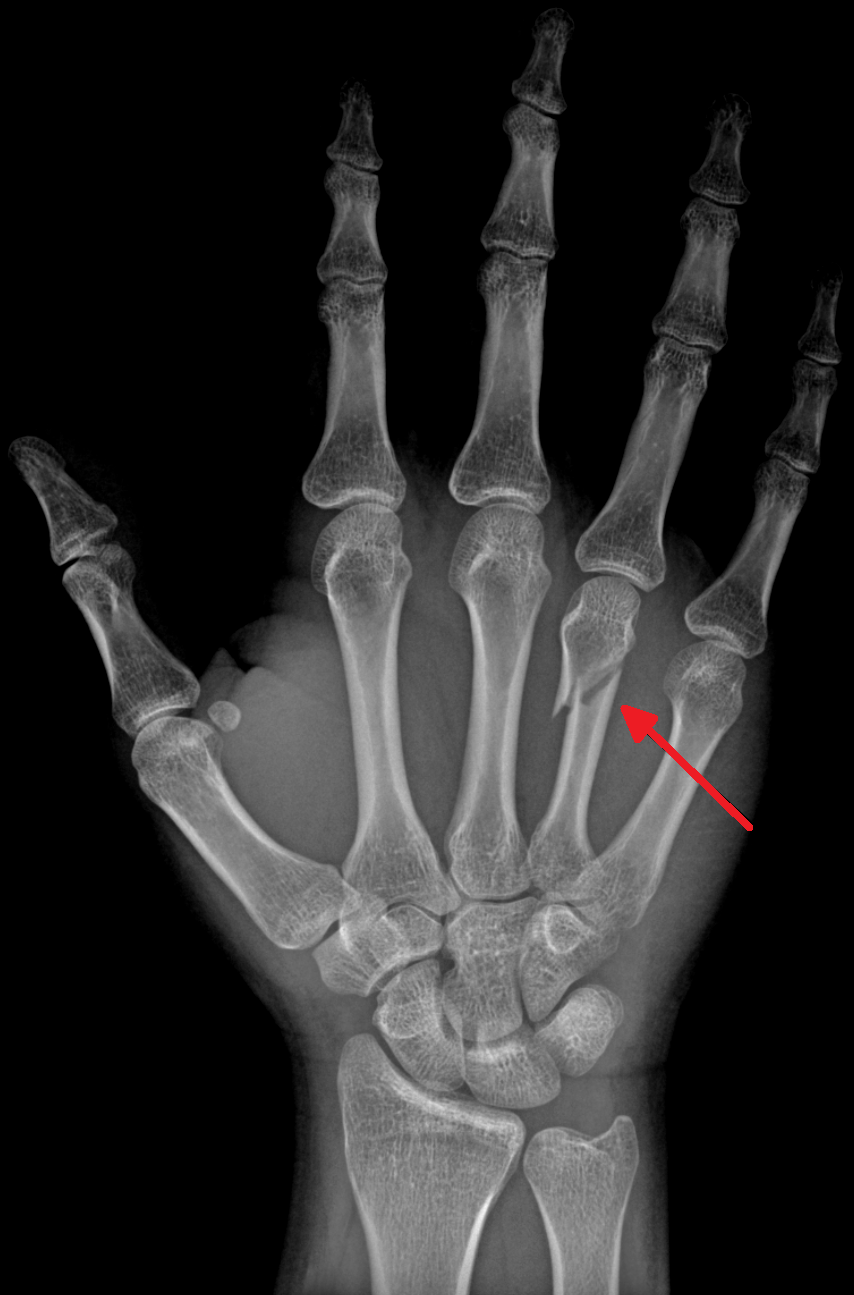
A fractured right hand fourth metacarpal (boxer's fracture).

== See also ==
- Metacarpus
- First metacarpal bone
- Second metacarpal bone
- Third metacarpal bone
- Fifth metacarpal bone
