= Fifth metacarpal bone =

Metacarpal bone of the little finger

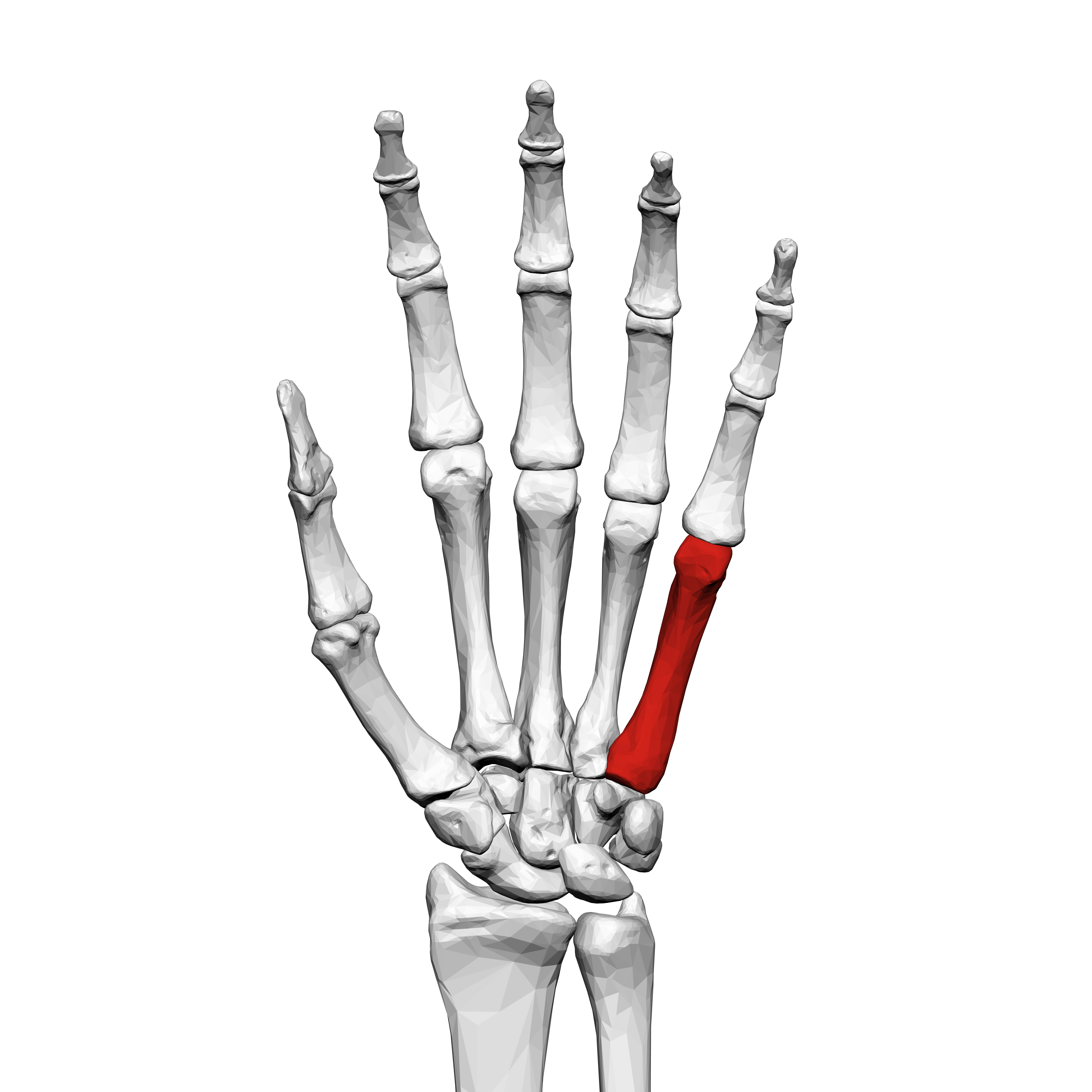
- Fifth metacarpal of the left hand (shown in red). Palmar view.

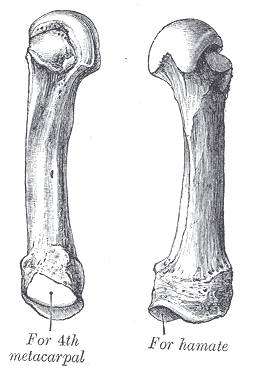
- The fifth metacarpal. (Left.)

Details

Identifiers
- Latin: os metacarpale V
- FMA: 23903

The fifth metacarpal bone (metacarpal bone of the little finger or pinky finger) is the most medial and second-shortest of the metacarpal bones.

== Surfaces ==
It presents on its base one facet on its superior surface, which is concavo-convex and articulates with the hamate, and one on its radial side, which articulates with the fourth metacarpal.

On its ulnar side is a prominent tubercle for the insertion of the tendon of the extensor carpi ulnaris muscle.

The dorsal surface of the body is divided by an oblique ridge, which extends from near the ulnar side of the base to the radial side of the head. The lateral part of this surface serves for the attachment of the fourth interosseus dorsalis; the medial part is smooth, triangular, and covered by the extensor tendons of the little finger.

The palmar surface is similarly divided: Its lateral side (facing the fourth metacarpal) provides the origin for the third palmar interosseus, its medial side contains the insertion of opponens digiti quinti.

== Clinical significance ==
A fracture of the fourth and/or fifth metacarpal bones transverse neck secondary due to axial loading is known as a boxer's fracture. The fifth metacarpal bone is the most common bone to be injured when throwing a punch.

== Ossification ==
The ossification process begins in the shaft during prenatal life, and in the head between 11th and 37th months.

== Additional images ==
Fifth metacarpal bone of the left hand (shown in red). Animation.

Fifth metacarpal bone of the left hand. Close up.

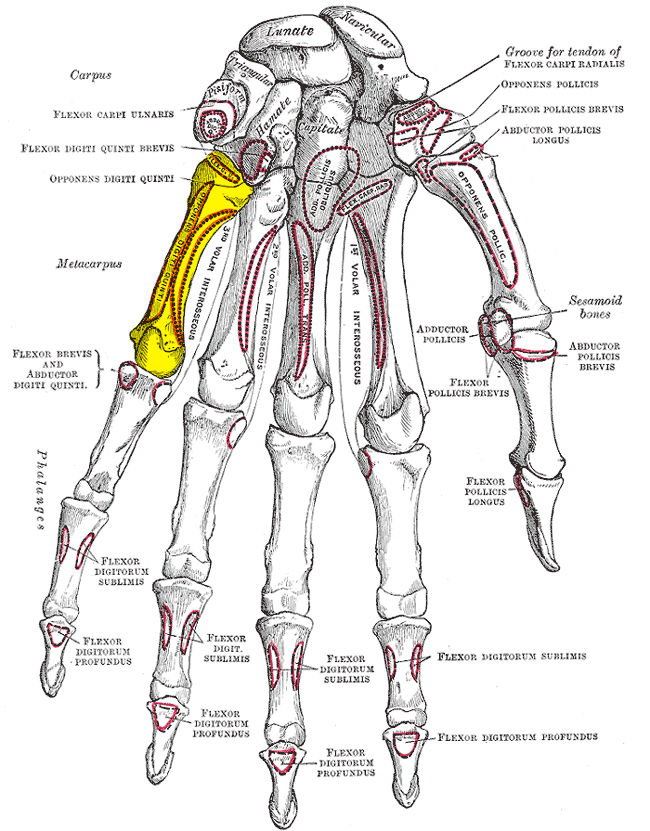
Palmer view of the left hand (fifth metacarpal shown in yellow).

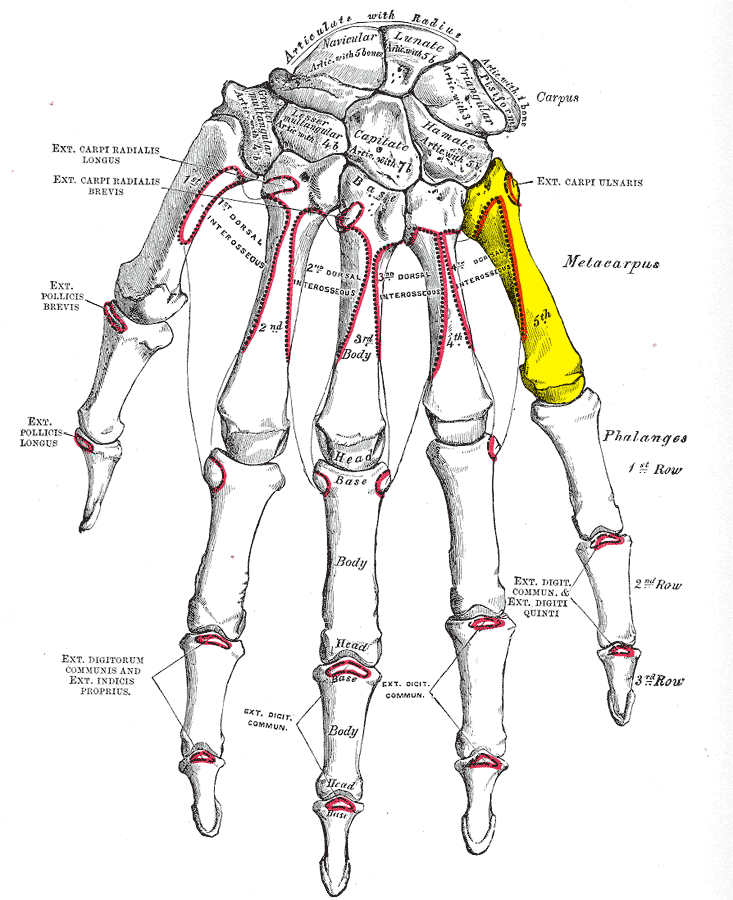
Dorsal view of the left hand (fifth metacarpal shown in yellow).

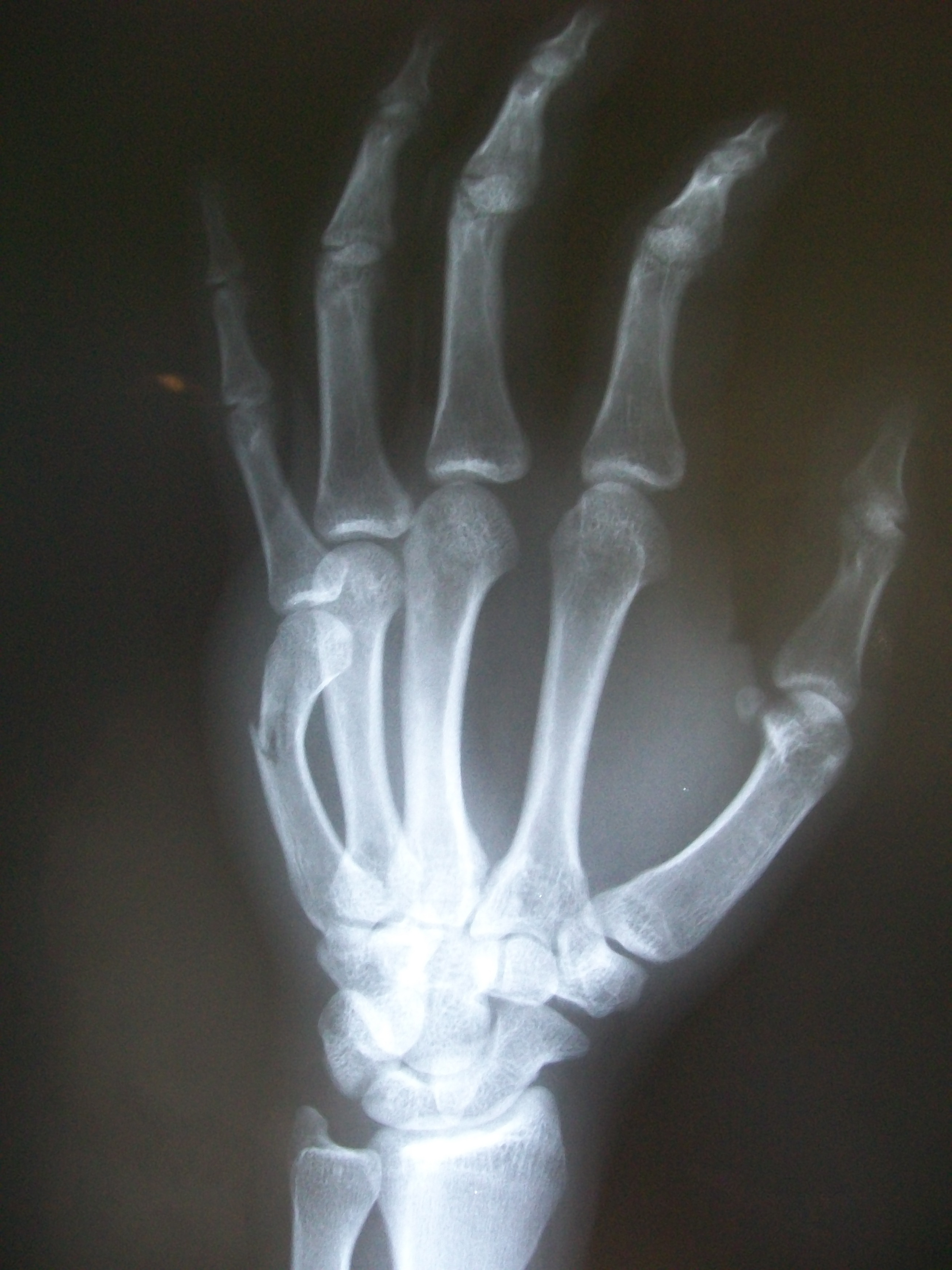
Fracture of the fifth metacarpal (boxer's fracture).

== See also ==
- Metacarpus
- First metacarpal bone
- Second metacarpal bone
- Third metacarpal bone
- Fourth metacarpal bone
