= Wrist roller =

Device to strengthen forearm muscles

The wrist roller is a device designed for strengthening the forearm muscles together in a rolling-pulling motion. It consists of a bar of varying lengths, with a cord or rope attached, which the user rolls and unrolls. This is resisted by the weight of a mass at the bottom of the cord. Rolled and unrolled, it has a concentric and eccentric proportion. Different forearm muscles, specifically the flexors and extensors can be targeted by rolling the bar in opposite directions; that is by having the rope either on your side or on the opposite one respectively. It can even be performed (with lighter weights) manipulated by the fingertips to develop dexterity.

The length of the rope determines the length of time one will take to vary between the concentric and eccentric portions (though it will always be the same length, if rolled and unrolled at the same pace). Strength is built by using a larger weight. The focus on gripping muscles versus wrist extensor muscles can be varied based upon the thickness of the bar. Speed and explosiveness is obtained by rolling at faster paces, easier with lighter weights.

In addition to the rolling, there is also a function of wrist and shoulder supination inherent in the exercise, as one hand will hold and twist the weight, keeping the other side level, while the other lets go as to let it rotate and shift the grip. This is more apparent with heavier weights. Normally held in front of the body, this focus can be somewhat altered by the height/angle the bar is held at. A posture in which the arms are held in front of the pelvis is preferred as this reduces the weight borne by the shoulders and reduces the tendency for the elbow muscles to take up some of the work. This does however effectively shorten the length of rope or cord, so one may wish to stand on a raised platform of some sort if a more prolonged "rep" is desired. This can be reversed by holding it behind the body from below or above, allowing a different focus of muscles as well as a prolonged stretch for flexibility and endurance. It can be done at home also by tying a rope to a rod and attach it to weight like dumbbell or water buckets (with water filled as per your strength and ability).
