= Second metacarpal bone =

Bone of the index finger

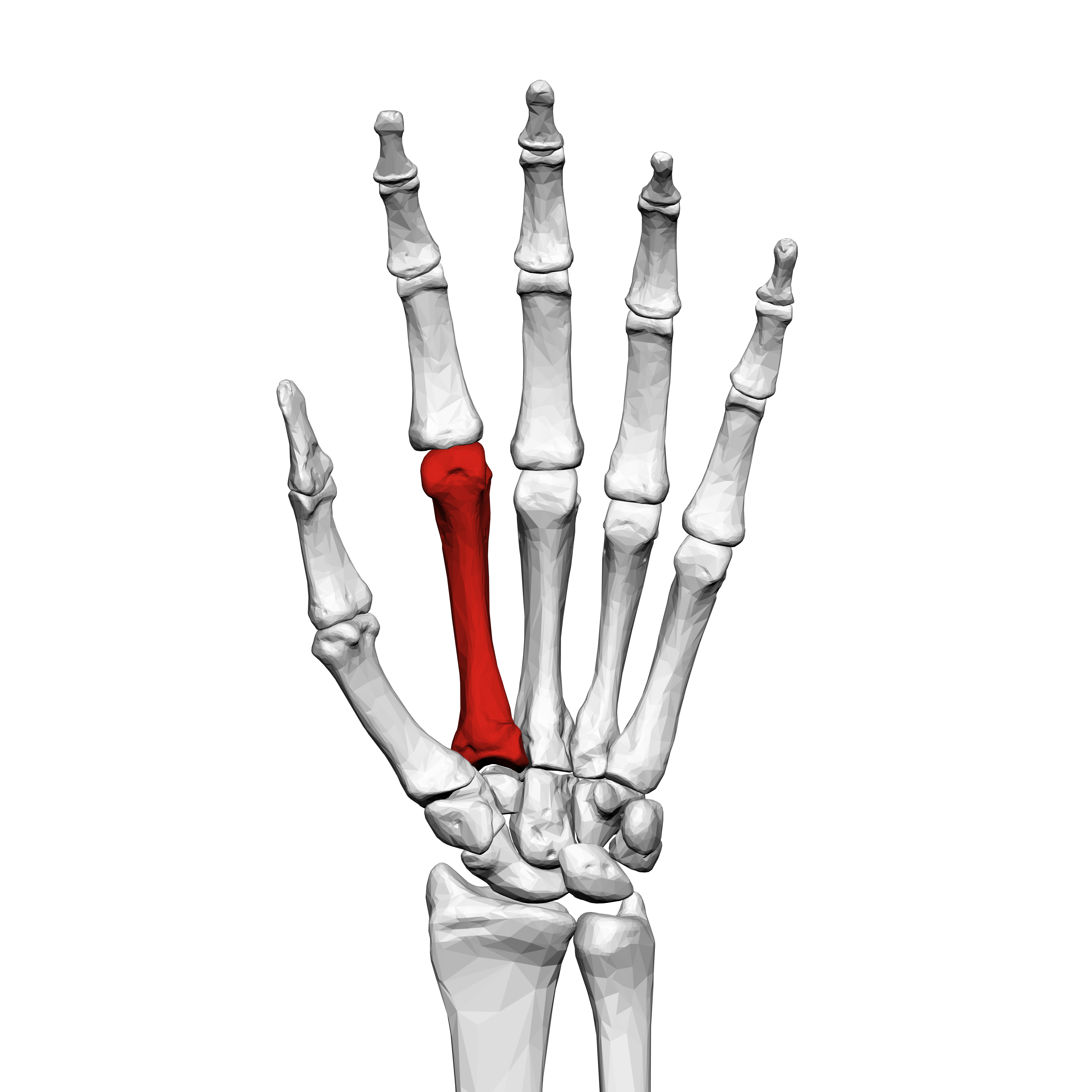
- Second metacarpal of the left hand (shown in red). Palmar view.

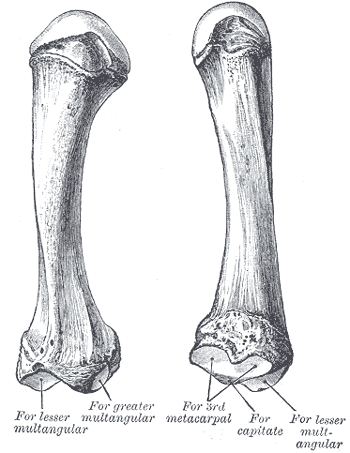
- The second metacarpal. (Left.)

Details

Identifiers
- Latin: os metacarpale II
- FMA: 23900

The second metacarpal bone (metacarpal bone of the index finger) is the longest, and its base the largest, of all the metacarpal bones.

== Human anatomy ==
Its base is prolonged upward and medialward, forming a prominent ridge.

It presents four articular facets, three on the upper surface and one on the ulnar side:

- Of the facets on the upper surface:
  - the intermediate is the largest and is concave from side to side, convex from before backward for articulation with the lesser multangular;
  - the lateral is small, flat and oval for articulation with the greater multangular;
  - the medial, on the summit of the ridge, is long and narrow for articulation with the capitate.
- The facet on the ulnar side articulates with the third metacarpal.

The extensor carpi radialis longus muscle is inserted on the dorsal surface and the flexor carpi radialis muscle on the volar surface of the base. The shaft gives origin to the first palmar interosseus and the first and second dorsal interossei.

This bone is often the most prone to damage from fast bowlers in cricket, as it is furthest down the bat handle on both left- and right-handers, and as such is in danger of being struck by balls that are pitched short.

== Evolution ==
The articulation between the second metacarpal and the capitate is considered uniquely specialized in hominids. On the second metacarpal, the facet for the capitate is directed proximally, almost perpendicular to the facet for the third metacarpal, while the corresponding facet on the capitate is oriented distally. This is to receive compressive forces generated by the pad-to-pad opposition between the thumb and the index finger. In contrast, in apes, including fossil apes such as Dryopithecus and Proconsul, these facets are oriented in a sagittal plane. In quadrupedal monkeys these facets are oriented slightly differently due to their locomotor behaviour.

In Oreopithecus, a Miocene hominid that became extinct 7 million years ago, the orientation of the facet on the second metacarpal is similar to human conditions — an indication that it had the capability of pad-to-pad precision grip. Oreopithecus also lacks the waisted capitate associated with apes and climbing still present in Australopithecus.

== Ossification ==
The metacarpal bone of the index finger has two centres of ossification: a primary centre in the shaft and a secondary centre in the head. This contrasts to the first metacarpal bone where the secondary centre is found in the base. The ossification process begins in the shaft during prenatal life, and in the head between 11th and 22nd months.

== Additional images ==
Second metacarpal bone of the left hand (shown in red). Animation.

Second metacarpal bone of the left hand. Close up.

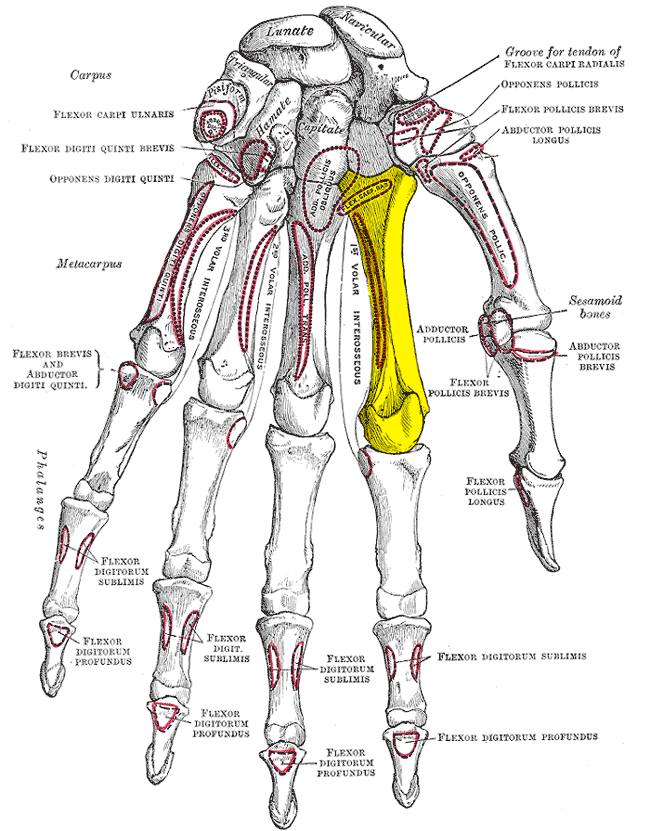
Palmer view of the left hand (second metacarpal shown in yellow).

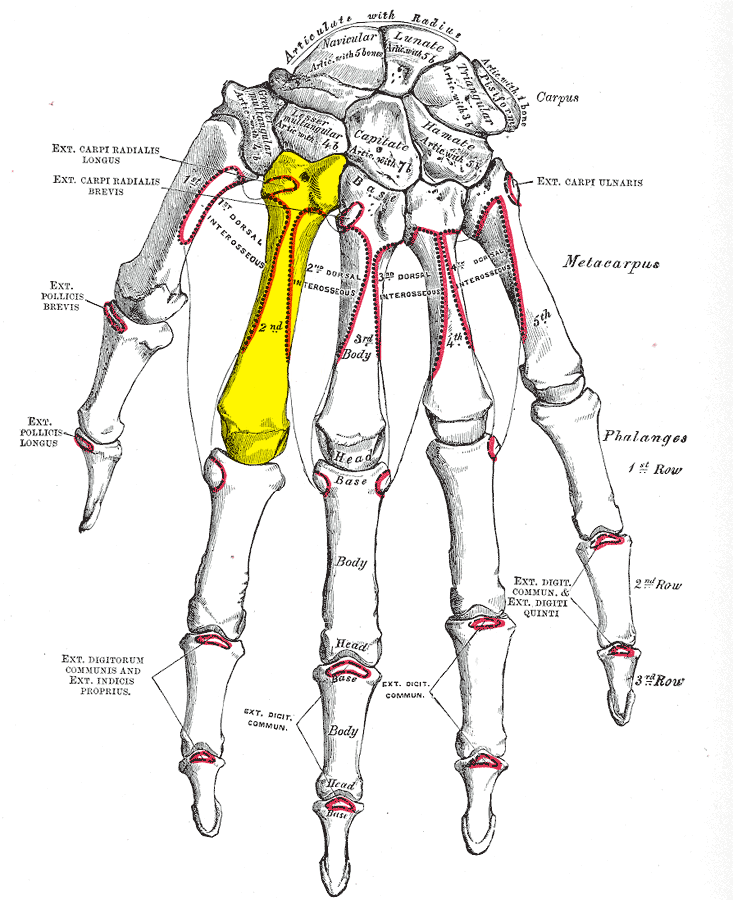
Dorsal view of the left hand (second metacarpal shown in yellow).

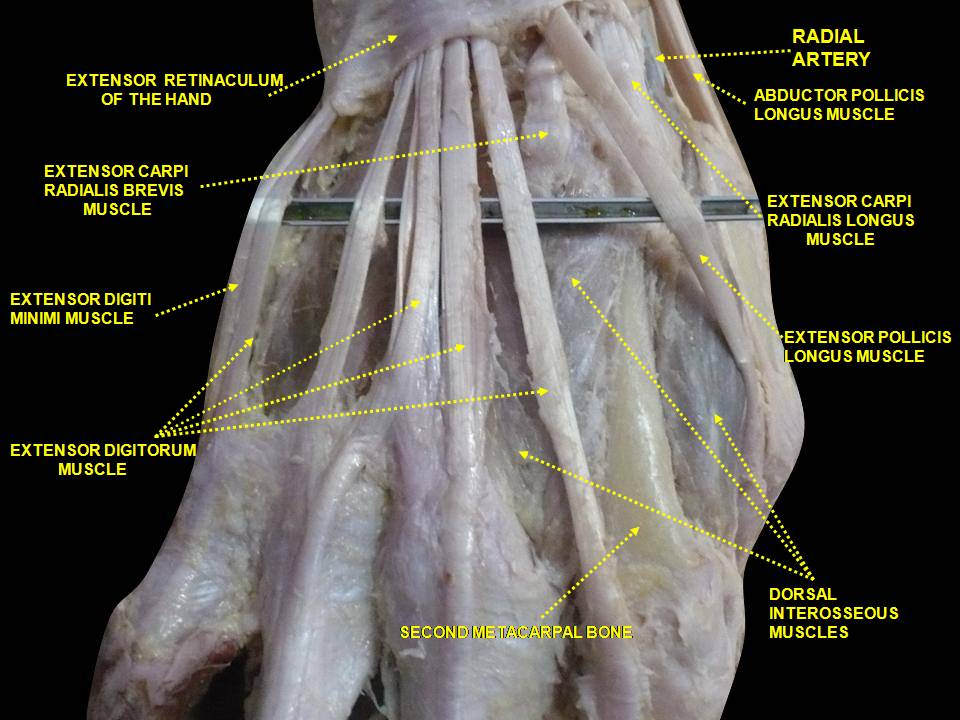
Second metacarpal bone.Deep dissection.

== See also ==
- Metacarpus
- First metacarpal bone
- Third metacarpal bone
- Fourth metacarpal bone
- Fifth metacarpal bone
