= Third metacarpal bone =

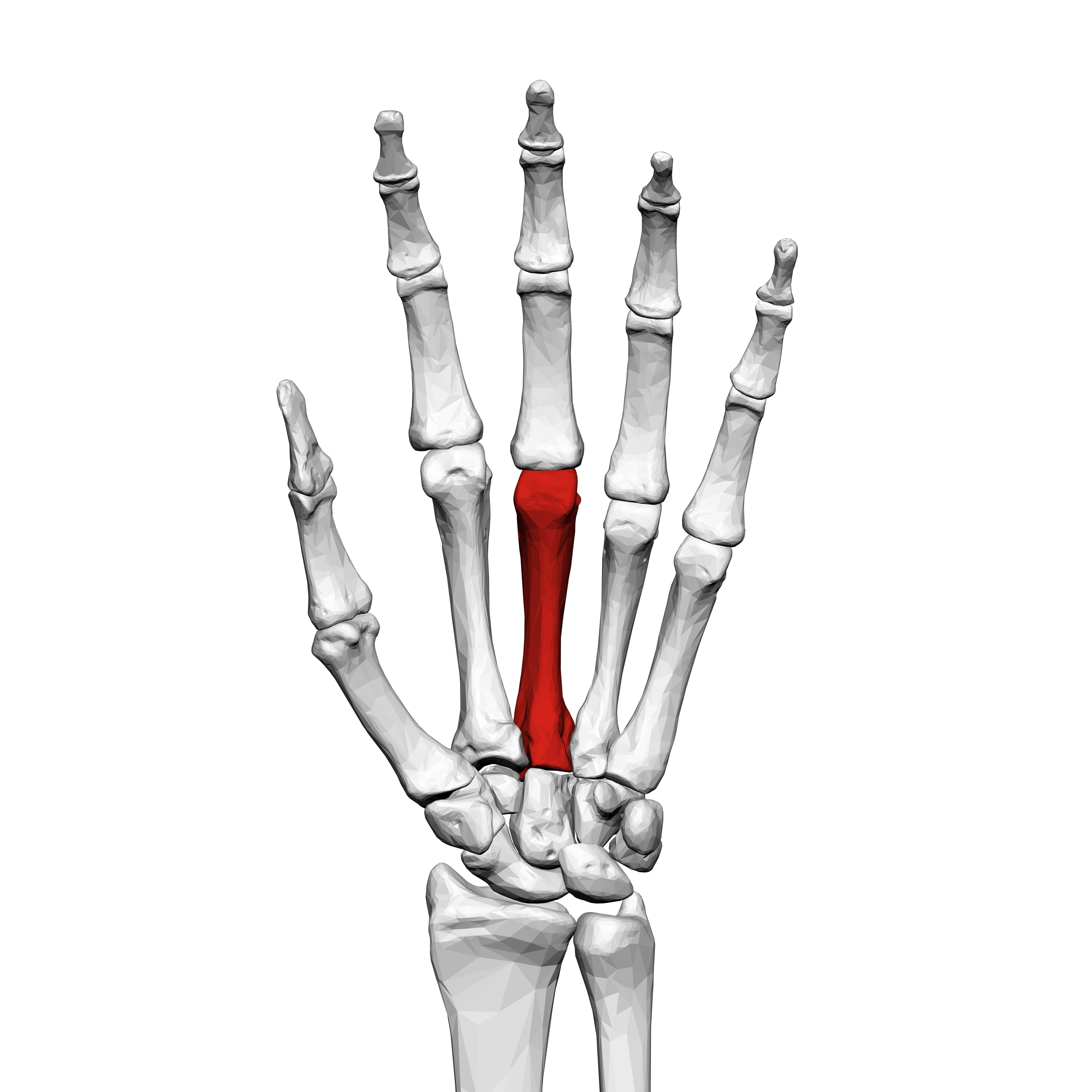
- Third metacarpal of the left hand (shown in red). Palmar view.

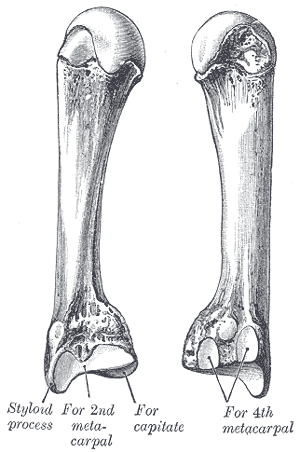
- The left third metacarpal.

Details

Identifiers
- Latin: os metacarpale III
- TA2: 1269
- FMA: 23901

The third metacarpal bone (metacarpal bone of the middle finger) is a little smaller than the second.

The dorsal aspect of its base presents on its radial side a pyramidal eminence, the styloid process, which extends upward behind the capitate; immediately distal to this is a rough surface for the attachment of the extensor carpi radialis brevis muscle.

The carpal articular facet is concave behind, flat in front, and articulates with the capitate.

On the radial side is a smooth, concave facet for articulation with the second metacarpal, and on the ulnar side two small oval facets for the fourth metacarpal.

== Ossification ==
The ossification process begins in the shaft during prenatal life, and in the head between the 11th and 27th months.

== Additional images ==
Third metacarpal bone of the left hand (shown in red). Animation.

Third metacarpal bone of the left hand. Close up.

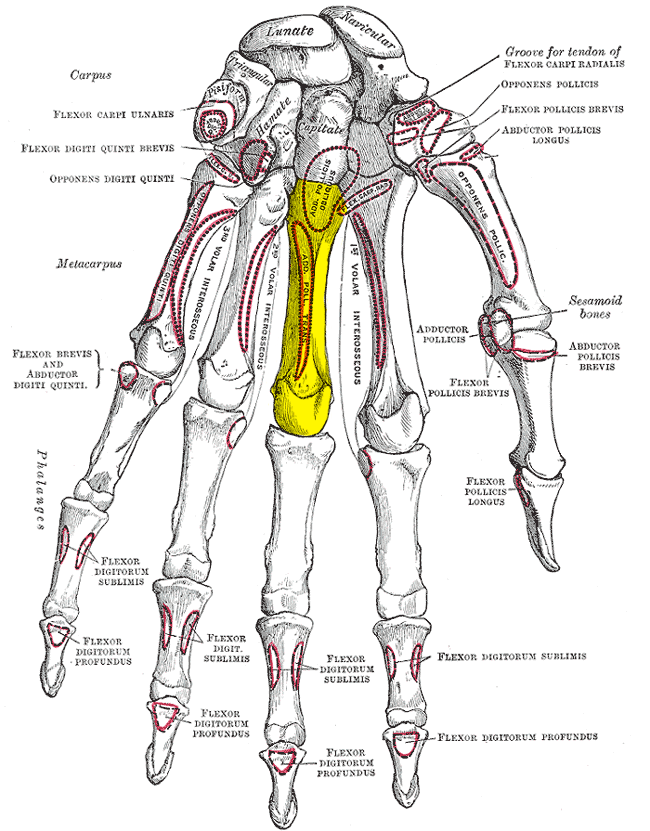
Palmer view of the left hand (third metacarpal shown in yellow).

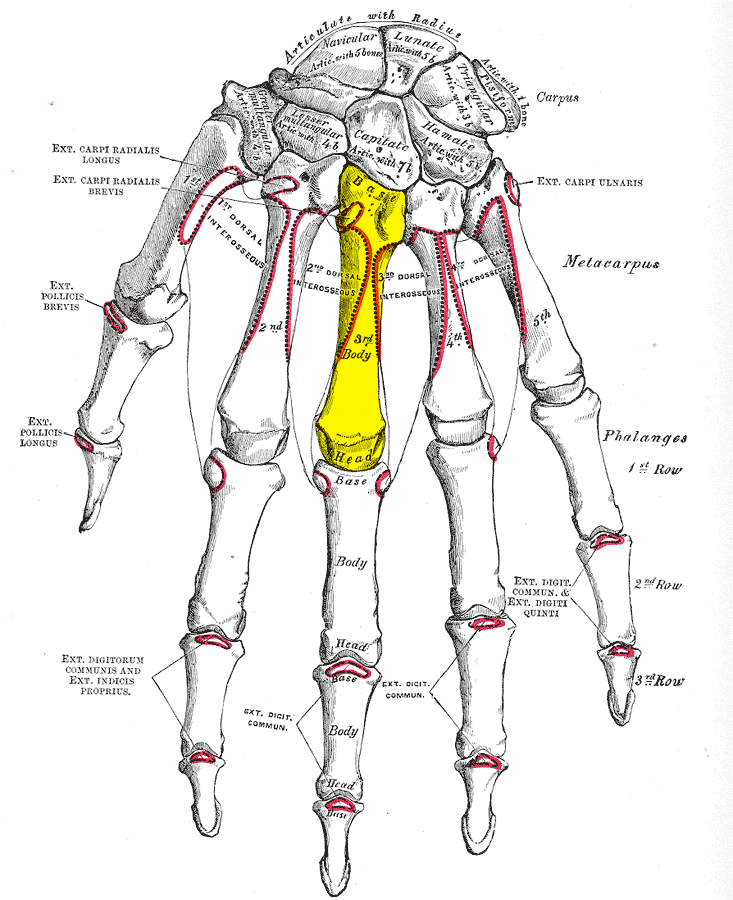
Dorsal view of the left hand (third metacarpal shown in yellow).

== See also ==
- Metacarpus
- First metacarpal bone
- Second metacarpal bone
- Fourth metacarpal bone
- Fifth metacarpal bone
