= Wayaosaurus =

Wayaosaurus Temporal range: Carnian

Scientific classification
- Domain: Eukaryota
- Kingdom: Animalia
- Phylum: Chordata
- Class: Reptilia
- Order: †Thalattosauria
- Superfamily: †Askeptosauroidea
- Genus: †Wayaosaurus; Zhou in Yin et al., 2000

Type species
- † Wayaosaurus geei Zhou in Yin et al., 2000

Other species
- † Wayaosaurus bellus (Zhou in Yin et al., 2000)

Extinct genus of reptiles

Wayaosaurus is an extinct genus of thalattosaurian reptile that lived in what is now China. There are two species. The type species W. geei and the second species, W. bellus were both named by the same authors in 2000.

== Description and species ==
=== Wayaosaurus geei ===
W. geei was discovered near the town of Xinpu in Guanling County of the Guizhou Province of China. The place it was found corresponds to the Wayao Member of the Falang Formation, which dates to the Carnian Stage of the Late Triassic. The holotype, given the specimen number Gmr 004 has been lost since its original description in 2000, and the existing records of its apparent diagnostic traits are actually synapomorphies of Thalattosauria as a whole. Modern publications treat W. bellus as the only valid species.

=== Wayaosaurus bellus ===
W. bellus was discovered in the same place as the undiagnostic type species. The holotype, originally named Gmr 003, but later redesignated GZDB 0005, consists of a partially complete skull with a mandible, most of the presacral vertebrae, pectoral girdle, all four limbs, and part of the pelvic girdle. It was given an emended diagnosis by Jun Chai and colleagues in 2023. Its autapomorphies include: a relatively short mandibular symphysis, a maximum transverse width of the skull in the temporal region, a moderate expansion at the distal end of the humerus, a well-developed inner trochanter on the femur, and a reduced deltopectoral crest.

== Classification ==
The classification of Thalattosauria has been controversial, and it is not known with confidence to which other reptiles they are closely related. They have been suggested to be relatives of Sauropterygia, Archosauromorpha, or possibly being part of a more primitive lineage. A cladogram summarizing the internal interrelationships of thalattosaurs, which was published by Chai and colleagues in their redescription of Wayaosaurus is shown below.

- Thalattosauria
  - Thalattosauroidea
    - Gunakadeit
    - Thalattosauridae
  - Askeptosauroidea
    - Askeptosaurus
    - - Endennasaurus
      - - Anshunsaurus huanggoushuensis
        - Anshunsaurus wushaensis
        - - Miodentosaurus
          - Wayaosaurus
