= Kienböck's disease =

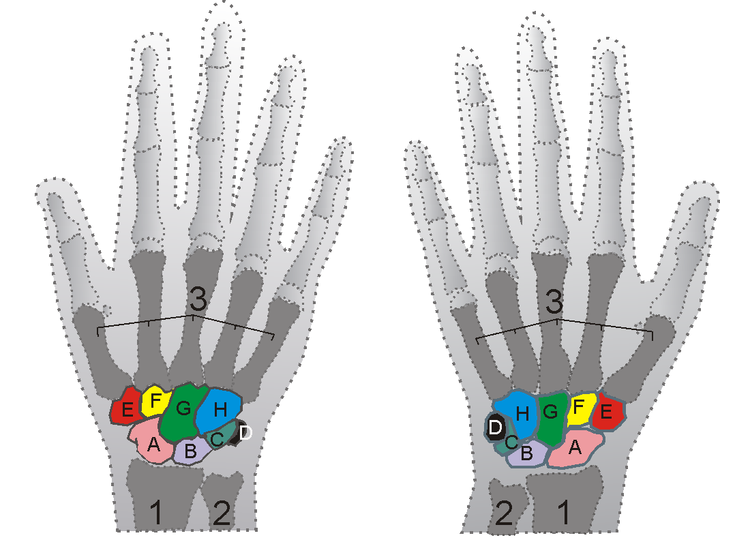
- Shown is the right hand, palm down (left) and palm up (right). Proximal: A=Scaphoid, B=Lunate, C=Triquetral, D=Pisiform; Distal: E=Trapezium, F=Trapezoid, G=Capitate, H=Hamate
- Specialty: Rheumatology, orthopedic surgery, plastic surgery
- Frequency: 0.005%

Kienböck's disease is a disorder of the wrist. It is named for Dr. Robert Kienböck, a radiologist in Vienna, Austria who described osteomalacia of the lunate in 1910.

It is breakdown of the lunate bone, a carpal bone in the wrist that articulates with the radius in the forearm. Specifically, Kienböck's disease is another name for avascular necrosis (death and fracture of bone tissue due to interruption of blood supply) with fragmentation and collapse of the lunate. This has classically been attributed to arterial disruption, but may also occur after events that produce venous congestion with elevated interosseous pressure.

== Cause ==
The cause of Kienböck's disease is unclear. Possible causes include trauma, particularly to the wrist; variations in the blood supply of the lunate bone; and differences in the length of the ulna (one of the bones in the forearm), known as ulnar variance. Negative ulnar variance means that the ulna is shorter than the radius, and is associated with an increased risk of Kienböck's disease. The bone loses its blood supply, leading to avascular necrosis. Recent imaging and histological studies have reinforced the importance of intraosseous vascularity, independent of factors like ulnar variance.

Studies have found a correlation between having Kienböck's and Western European ancestry, but no definitive link can be positively confirmed.

The necrosis of the lunate bone can frequently be traced to a trauma to the wrist, like a compound fracture, which could cause the lunate's blood supply to be interrupted. Blood flows to the lunate through several arteries, each supplying a percentage. When one of these pathways is severed, the likelihood the patient will develop necrosis increases. Despite a preponderance of evidence, no particular cause has been conclusively verified.

Data suggests that most people with Kienböck's are affected in their dominant hand, though about one-third report the condition in their non-dominant hand. In very few cases have there been people that have acquired it in both wrists.

Kienböck's disease is classified as a "rare disorder," meaning that it affects fewer than 200,000 people in the U.S. population.

Many people with Kienböck's are frustrated by the lack of consensus among hand surgeons about optimal treatments for Kienböck's. No matter what the disease's stage of progression, there is no one best treatment, and the decision is often based partially, or even mostly, on incidental factors such as the patient's pain tolerance, the patient's desire to return to active use of the hand (such as in manual occupations), and the surgeon's level of expertise with different treatments.

Though, since each case of Kienböck's is different, the makeup of the wrist and arm bones are important factors which are individualized to each patient. Therefore, one surgery will never be able to solve all the problems associated with the disease. Thus, no consensus can be reached among surgeons.

== Diagnosis ==
=== Radiographic classification ===
First described by David Lichtman et al. in 1977. The purpose of this classification system is to guide treatment and to enable comparison of clinical outcomes.

1. Stage I Normal radiograph (possible lunate fracture).
2. Stage II Sclerosis of the lunate without collapse. (Portions of the lunate begin to deteriorate. This shows as a white blemish on x-rays.)
3. Stage IIIA Lunate collapse and fragmentation, in addition to proximal migration of the capitate.
4. Stage IIIB Lunate collapse and fragmentation, in addition to proximal migration of the capitate. In addition there is fixed flexion deformity of the scaphoid.
5. Stage IV Changes up to and including fragmentation, with radiocarpal and midcarpal arthritic changes.

== Treatment ==
Operations that attempt to restore a blood supply to the lunate may be performed.

Depending on the stage the disease is in when it is discovered, varying treatments are applied.

If X-rays show a mostly intact lunate (not having lost a great deal of size, and not having been compressed into a triangular shape), but an MRI shows a lack of blood flow to the bone, then revascularization is normally attempted. Revascularization techniques, usually involving a bone graft taken elsewhere from the body — often held in place by an external fixator for a period of weeks or months — have been successful at stages as late as 3B, although their use at later stages (like most treatments for Kienböck's) is controversial. One conservative treatment option would be using an Ultrasound Bone Stimulator, which uses low-intensity pulsed ultrasound to increase vascular endothelial growth factor (VEG-F) and increase blood flow to the bone.

Some Kienböck's patients present with an abnormally large difference in length between the radius and the ulna, termed "ulnar variance", which is hypothesized to cause undue pressure on the lunate, contributing to its avascularity. In cases with such a difference, radial shortening is commonly performed. In this procedure, the radius (the lateral long bone) is shortened by a given length, usually between 2 and 5 mm, to relieve the pressure on the dying lunate. A titanium plate is inserted to hold the newly shortened bone together.

During Stage 3, the lunate has begun to break apart due to the pressure of the surrounding bones. This causes sharp fragments of bone to float between the joints, causing excruciating pain. At this point, the lunate is ready for removal. The most frequently performed surgery is the Proximal Row Carpectomy, where the lunate, scaphoid and triquetrum are extracted. This greatly limits the range of motion of the wrist, but pain relief can be achieved for longer than after the other surgeries.

Another surgical option for this stage is a titanium, silicon or pyrocarbon implant that takes place of the lunate, though doctors shy from this due to a tendency of the implant to smooth the edges of the surrounding bones, thus causing painful pinched nerves when the bones slip out of place.

After the lunate is removed, another procedure, ulnar shortening can be performed. This relieves pressure on the newly formed wrist joint of the pisiform, hamate and capitate. Depending on the surgeon, the procedure may be performed the same way as the radial shortening where a small section is removed, or the entire top of the ulna may be excised.

At Stage 4, the lunate has completely disintegrated and the other bones in the wrist have radiated downward to fill in the void. The hand now has a deformed appearance. The only procedure that can be done is the total wrist fusion, where a plate is inserted on the top of the wrist from the radius to the carpals, effectively freezing all flexion and movement in the wrist. Rotation is still possible as it is controlled by the radius and ulna.

This is currently the last and most complete surgical option for those with Kienböck's. Most of the treatments described here are not mutually exclusive — meaning that a single patient may receive many of them in his quest to relieve pain. For instance, some patients have had casting, bone graft, radial shortening, proximal row carpectomy, and wrist fusion, all on the same hand. Recent studies suggest that vascularized bone grafting techniques, such as the use of pedicled or free vascularized grafts, may enhance revascularization of the lunate and improve functional outcomes, particularly in younger patients with early-stage disease. Arthroscopic techniques have also gained popularity due to their minimally invasive nature and potential for quicker recovery.

A 2024 phase I clinical trial reported that local transplantation of autologous bone marrow–derived mesenchymal stromal cells following lunate core decompression was safe in patients with stage II Kienböck disease. Over six months of follow-up, no serious adverse events were observed, and patients showed reduced pain, improved wrist function, and decreased lunate sclerosis, suggesting potential therapeutic benefit.

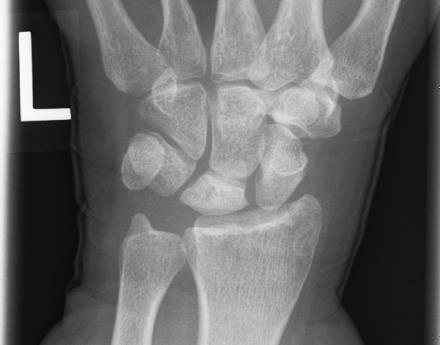
Left hand x-ray with Kienbock's Disease showing 4 mm negative ulnar variance and Kienbock's Disease Stage IIIB

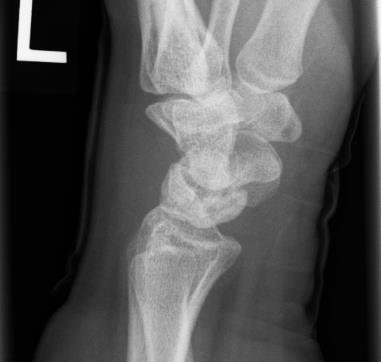
Left hand x-ray with Kienbock's Disease

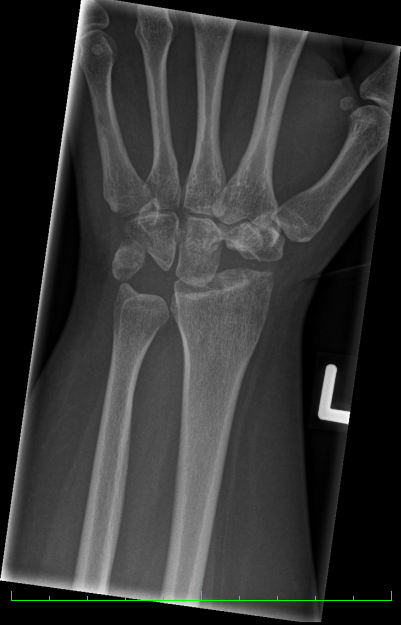
Left hand x-ray post proximal row carpectomy

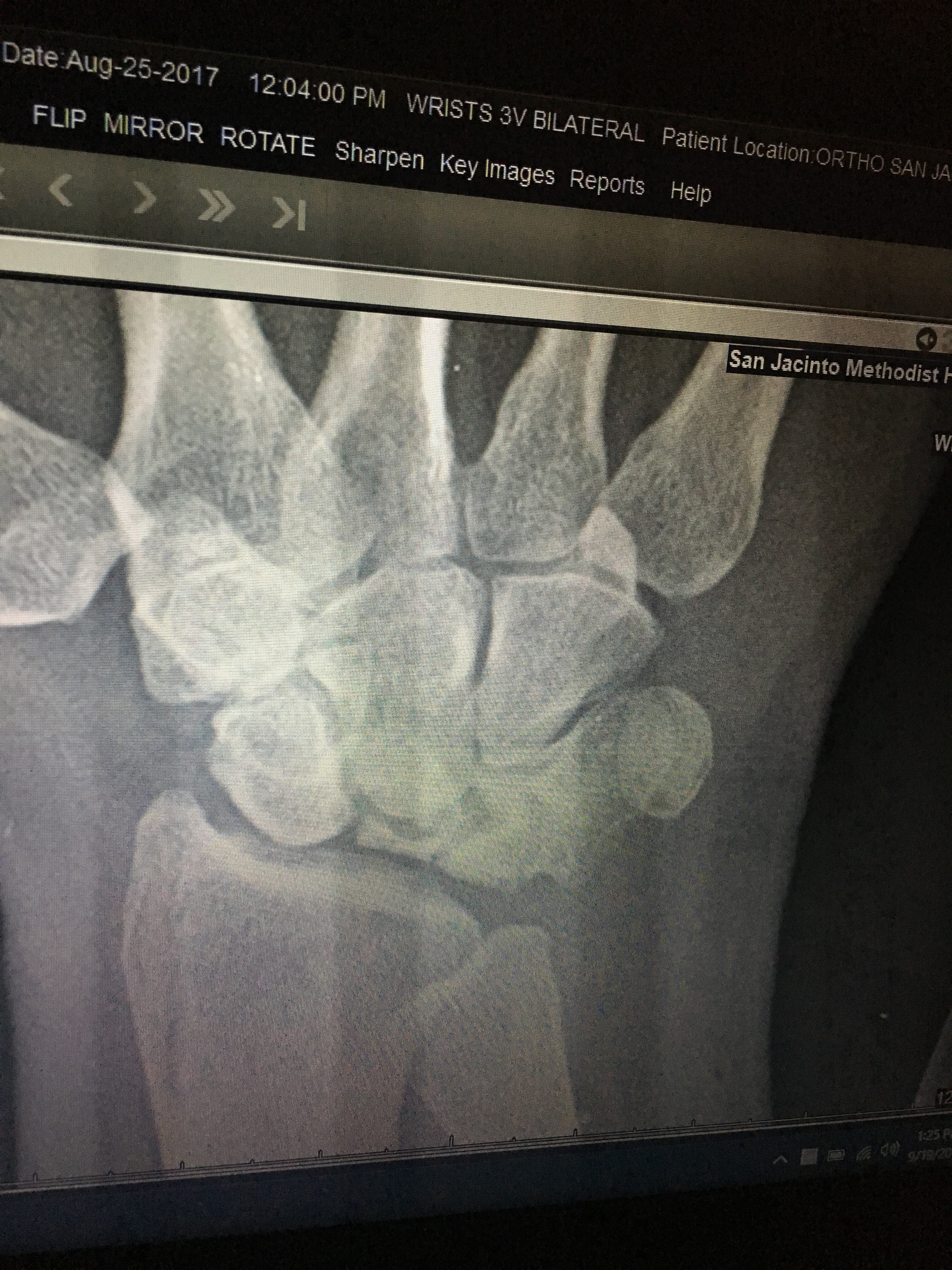
X-ray showing stage IIIB on right wrist, with ulnar impingement.

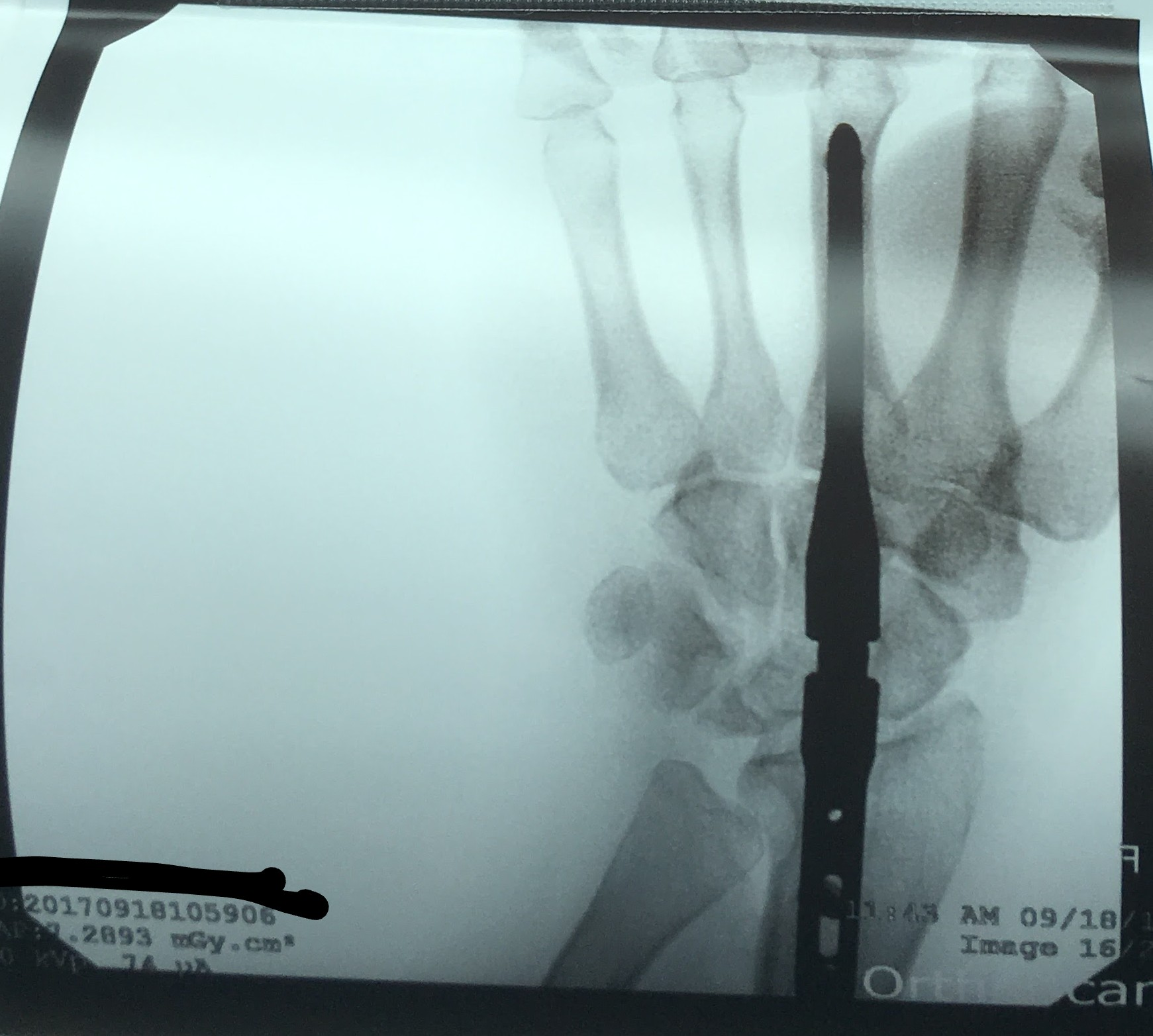
X-ray on the right wrist showing arthrodesis.

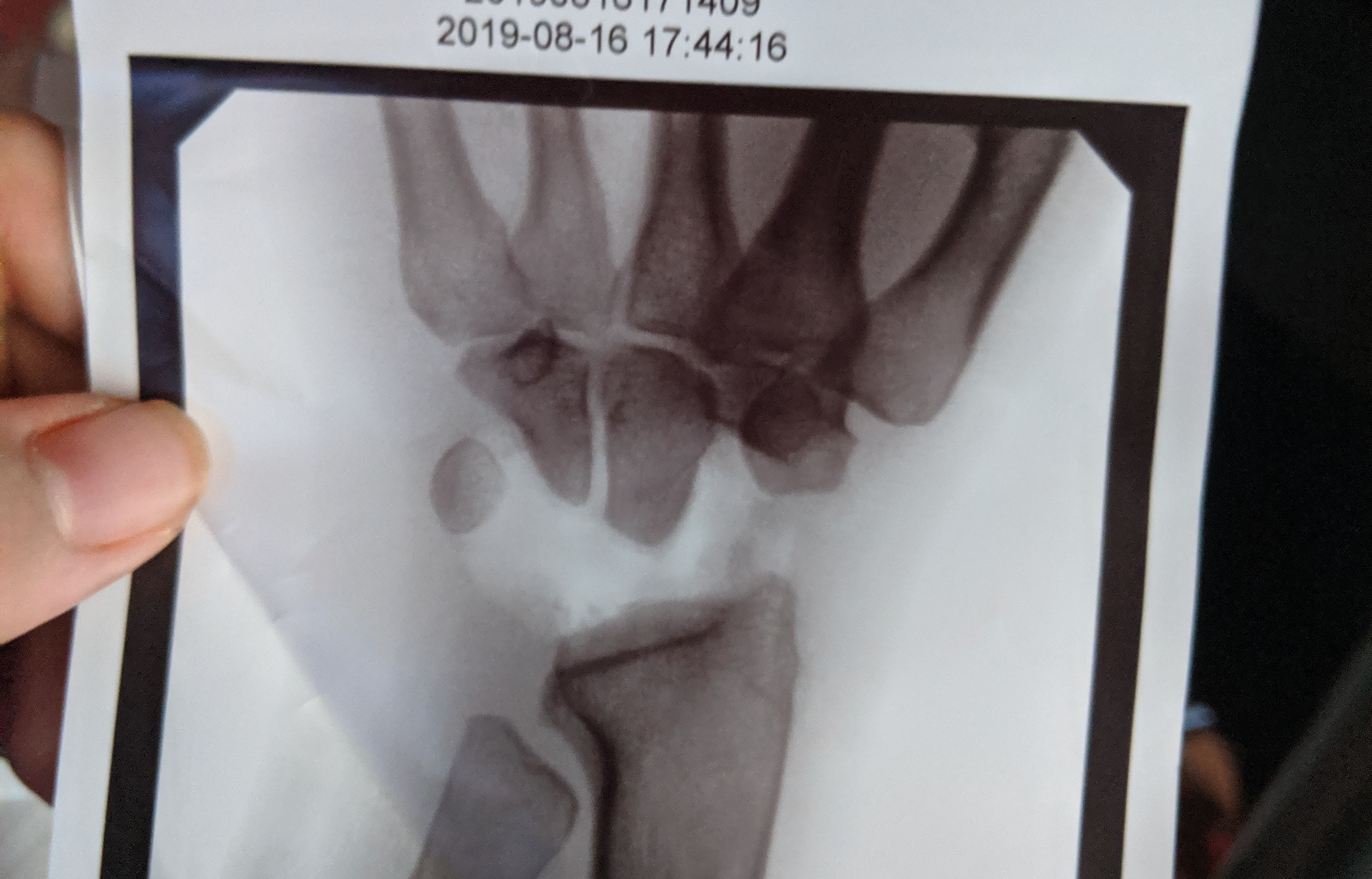
X-Ray on Left Hand Post-Proximal Row Carpectomy, in Traction.

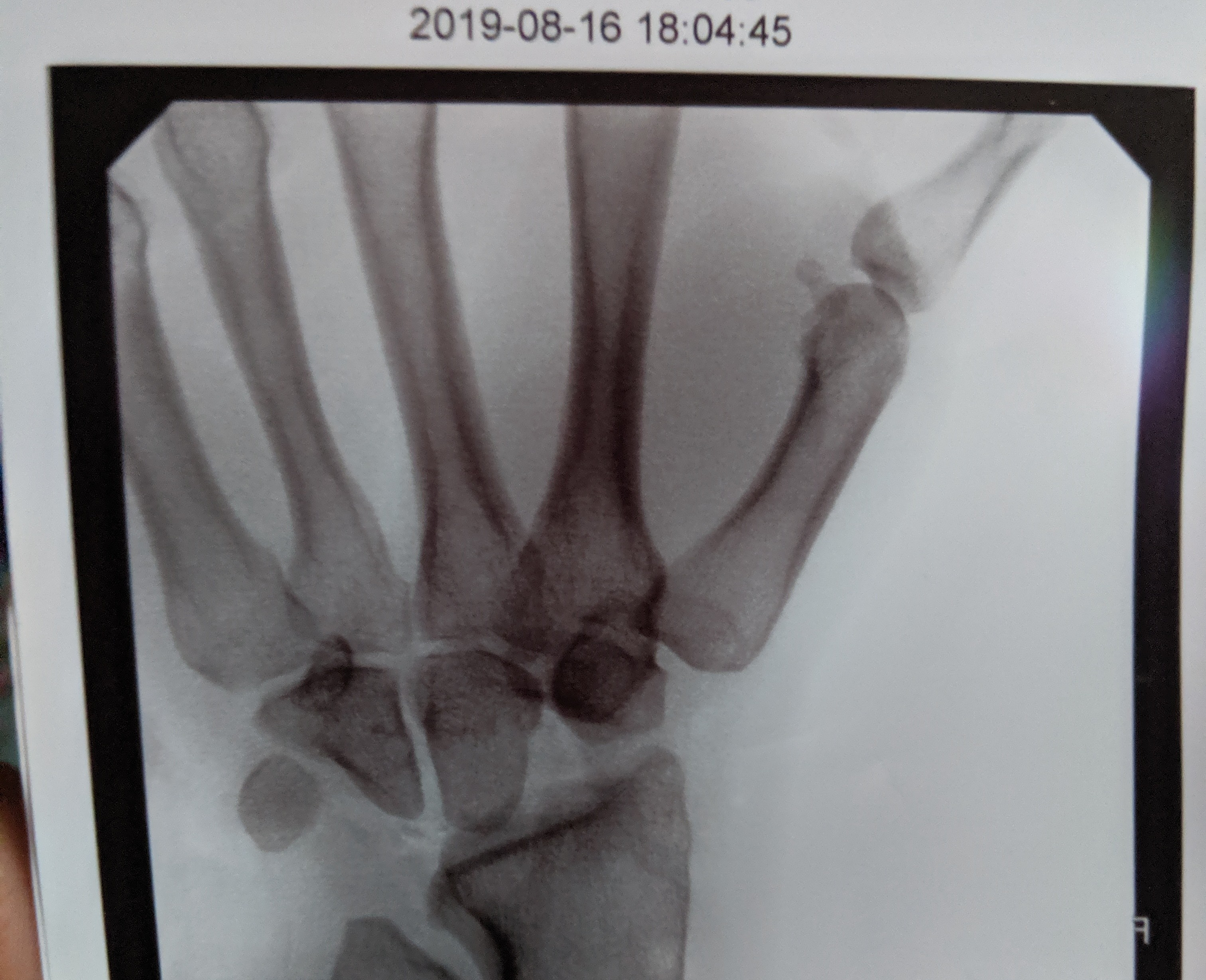
X-Ray on Left Hand Post-Proximal Row Carpectomy.

== Prognosis ==
The prognosis of Kienböck's disease largely depends on the stage at diagnosis and the treatment modality employed. Early-stage disease managed conservatively may result in minimal long-term impairment. However, in advanced stages, there is a significant risk of lunate collapse, progressive wrist arthritis, and functional limitation despite surgical intervention.
