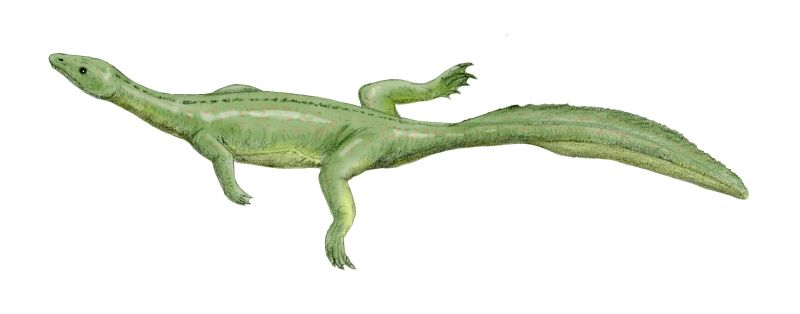
- Life restoration

Scientific classification
- Domain: Eukaryota
- Kingdom: Animalia
- Phylum: Chordata
- Class: Reptilia
- Order: †Thalattosauria
- Family: †Askeptosauridae
- Genus: †Miodentosaurus; Cheng et al., 2007

Type species
- Miodentosaurus brevis Cheng et al., 2007

= Miodentosaurus =

Miodentosaurus Temporal range: Late Triassic ~235.0–221.5 Ma

Extinct genus of reptiles

Miodentosaurus is a genus of thalattosaurian (a type of extinct marine reptile) from the Late Triassic of China. It is one of several thalattosaurs found in the Xiaowa Formation, also known as the Wayao Member of the Falang Formation. The genus name "Miodentosaurus" translates to "Few toothed-lizard" while the species name "brevis" means "short", in reference to its short snout.

== Description ==
Miodentosaurus is a thalattosaur, a group of marine reptiles with long, paddle-like tails and short legs with independently movable digits. It was a large member of the group, with a complete specimen measuring 4.4 metres (14 ft) long. Miodentosaurus is specifically an Askeptosauroid, a specific group of thalattosaurs with rather straight snouts. Despite being closely related to Askeptosaurus (a thalattosaur with a very long and toothy snout), Miodentosaurus had a quite short snout (shorter than the rest of the head) with only a few conical teeth on the premaxillae and dentaries. Although this snout configuration is not known in any other thalattosaurians, Miodentosaurus does share a number of other features with Askeptosauroids, such as having 10 neck vertebrae and a large pineal foramen.

Apart from its unique cranial features, Miodentosaurus also has characteristically flat front claws and the two specimens known were both more than four meters long, making it one of the largest thalattosaurs known.

== History and specimens ==
The holotype of Miodentosaurus brevis, NMNS 004727 / F003960, is a well-preserved and fairly complete articulated skeleton. It was discovered in the Carnian-age Xiaowa Formation (or Wayao Member of the Falang Formation) of China, where other thalattosaurs as Anshunsaurus huangguoshuensis and Concavispina biseridens were found. The skull and mandibles were the first elements described in 2007, while the postcranial skeleton was described in 2009.

An even more complete specimen, ZMNH M8742, was described in 2010. This specimen is one of the most complete thalattosaur skeletons known and also depicts pelvic, metatarsal, and coracoid features different from those of the holotype, showing instances of individual variation within the genus.

A 2023 study by Chai et al. suggested that Miodentosaurus may actually represent the same animal as the contemporary Wayaosaurus, which was named in 2007, based on similarities in the skull, dorsal vertebrae, and pubis. This would render Miodentosaurus a subjective junior synonym of that genus. They also speculated that it is possible the two represent distinct species within the same genus.
