= Semilunar =

Semilunar can refer to:

- Semilunar valves
- Semilunar ganglion, or the trigeminal ganglion
- An older name for the Lunate bone
- In neurology, the semilunar fasciculus.
