= Robert Kienböck =

Austrian radiologist (1871–1953)

Robert Kienböck (11 January 1871 – 8 September 1953) was an Austrian radiologist who was a native of Vienna.

In 1895 he earned his medical doctorate at the University of Vienna, and spent the next year abroad (London and Paris). He returned to Vienna as an assistant to Leopold von Schrötter (1837–1908), a laryngologist, and began working in the new science of radiology. Several years later, he became head of the radiological department at Vienna General Hospital. In 1926 he became an associate professor of radiology.

In June 1923, along with Guido Holzknecht (1872-1931), he was co-founder of the Wiener Gesellschaft für Röntgenkunde (Vienna Radiology Society). He was elected president of the Österreichische Gesellschaft für Röntgenkunde (Austrian Radiology Society) in 1934 and honorary president of that body after the Second World War. With Holzknecht, he published the two-part Röntgenologie. Eine Revision ihrer technischen Einrichtungen und praktische Methoden (Roentgenology. A review of its technical facilities and practical methods).

Kienböck was a pioneer in the use of x-ray technology for medical diagnosis and therapy. He specialized in research of skeletal diseases and its treatment through radiology. In 1910 he described a disorder which consisted of breakdown of the lunate bone in the wrist. He called the disorder "lunatomalacia", which is now known as Kienböck's disease. Kienböck published his findings in a treatise titled Über traumatische Malazie des Mondbeins und ihre Folgezustände (Traumatic malacia of the lunate and its consequences).
