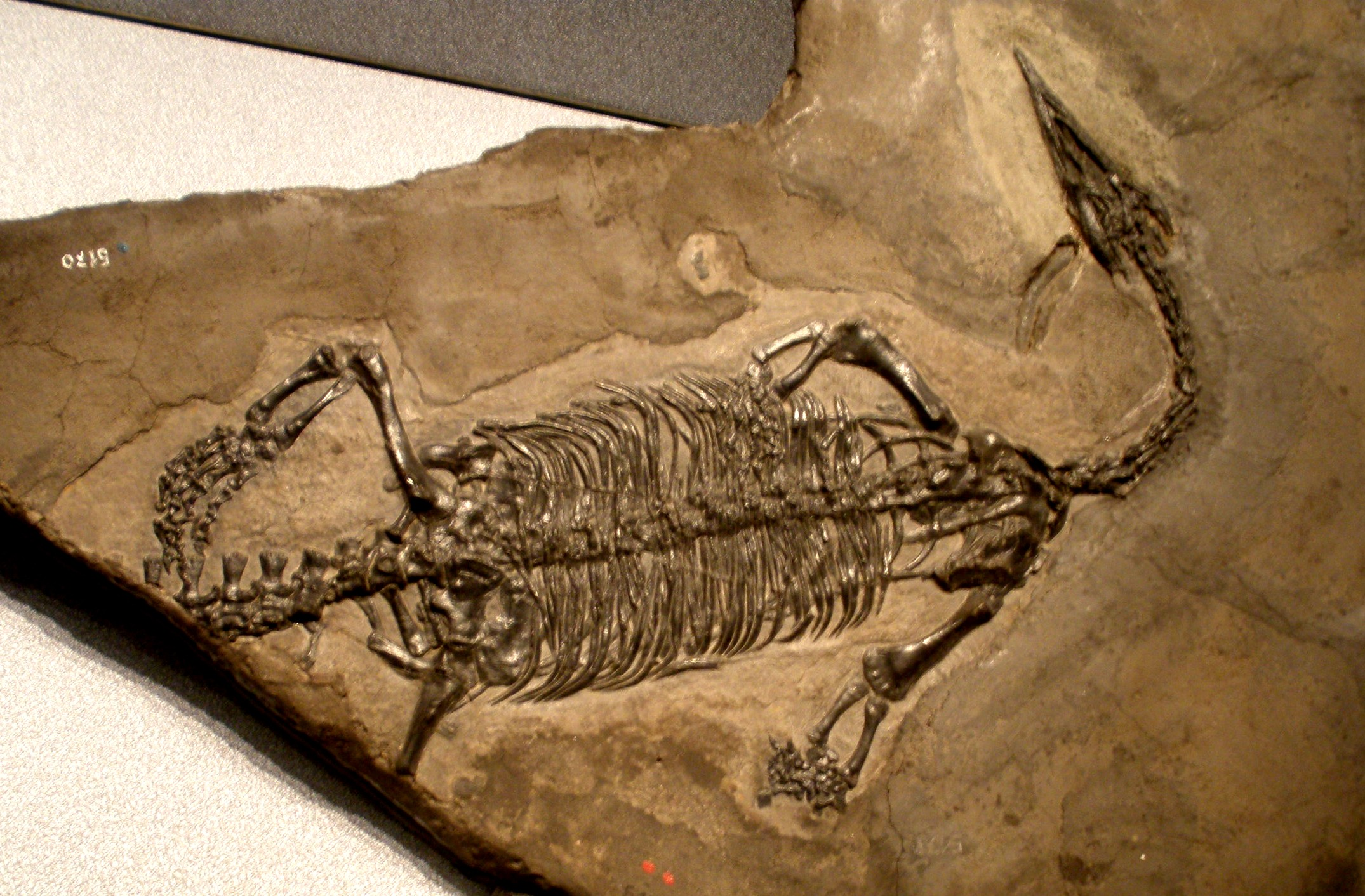
- Skeleton of Endennasaurus acutirostris

Scientific classification
- Kingdom: Animalia
- Phylum: Chordata
- Class: Reptilia
- Order: †Thalattosauria
- Superfamily: †Askeptosauroidea; Kuhn-Schnyder, 1971

Subtaxa
- †Endennasaurus; †Pachystropheus; †Wayaosaurus; †Askeptosauridae

= Askeptosauroidea =

Askeptosauroidea Temporal range: Anisian-Norian, 247–212 Ma

Extinct superfamily of reptiles

Askeptosauroidea is a superfamily of thalattosaurs, a Triassic group of marine reptiles. Askeptosauroidea is one of two major subgroups of Thalattosauria, the other being Thalattosauroidea. It includes the family Askeptosauridae and a more basal form called Endennasaurus.

== Phylogeny ==
Below is a cladogram from Wu et al. (2009) showing the phylogenetic relationships of Askeptosauroidea:

- Thalattosauria
  - Askeptosauroidea
    - Endennasaurus
    - Askeptosauridae
      - Anshunsaurus
      - - Askeptosaurus
        - Miodentosaurus
  - Thalattosauroidea
