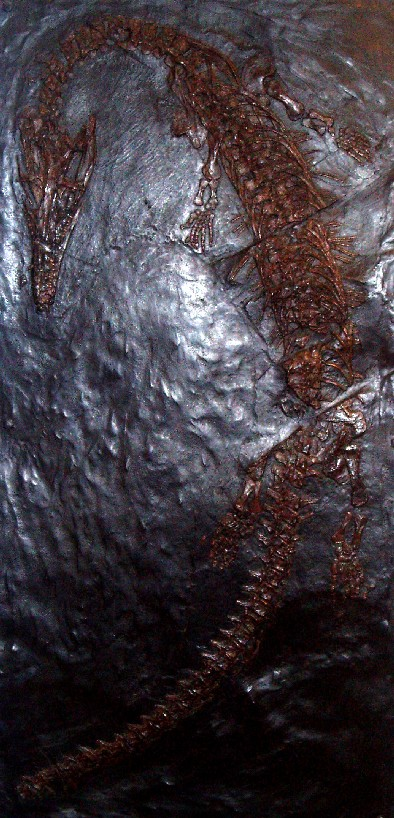
- Skeleton of Askeptosaurus italicus

Scientific classification
- Kingdom: Animalia
- Phylum: Chordata
- Class: Reptilia
- Order: †Thalattosauria
- Superfamily: †Askeptosauroidea
- Family: †Askeptosauridae; Kuhn-Schnyder, 1952

Subgroups
- †Askeptosaurus; †Anshunsaurus; †Miodentosaurus

= Askeptosauridae =

Askeptosauridae Temporal range: Anisian-Norian, 247–221.5 Ma

Extinct family of reptiles

Askeptosauridae is a family of thalattosaurs within the superfamily Askeptosauroidea. Fossils have been found from Italy, Switzerland, and China. Askeptosaurids are distinguished from other thalattosaurs by their long necks and narrow skulls.

== Classification ==
Askeptosauridae was named in 1952 to include the genus Askeptosaurus. In 2000, the genus Anshunsaurus, which includes two species, was added to the family. In a 2005 phylogenetic analysis, Endennasaurus was included within Askeptosauridae. Later that year a new study placed Endennasaurus outside Askeptosauridae as a basal member of Askeptosauroidea. More recent studies have placed the genus Miodentosaurus from China in the family as well. Below is a cladogram modified from Wu et al. (2009) showing the phylogenetic relationships of askeptosaurids:

- Askeptosauroidea
  - Endennasaurus acutirostris
  - Askeptosauridae
    - - Anshunsaurus huangguoshuensis
      - Anshunsaurus wushaensis
    - - Askeptosaurus italicus
      - Miodentosaurus brevis

It was assigned to Thalattosauria by Kuhn (1966) and Carroll (1988); and to Askeptosauroidea by Wu et al. (2009).

The Askeptosauridae is known to be from the Alpine Triassic and Southern China. The Endennasaurus is from the Norian age and is a sister taxon of Askeptosaurids. The Askeptoaurus which is the oldest known member of the Askeptosaurids derived from the Northern Tethyan Area.This information proposes that Edennasaurus and future askeptosaurids originated from that Northern Tethyan area.

When the two major thalattosaur assemblages split, the Edennasaurus and Askeptosaurids still kept some similar appendages to each other, such as a relatively well-ossified carpus and tarsus. These bone structures show that these animals still made trips onto the land around them. The development of the elongated neck was for these creatures to better catch their prey. As a longer and more mobile neck gives them more advantage to be able to catch their movable prey.
