= Hamate bone =

Carpal bone in the wrist

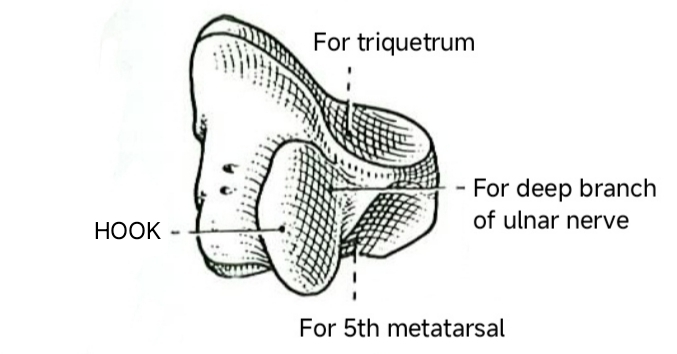
- The right hamate bone; anterior aspect. (After Charpy.)

Details
- Pronunciation: /ˈheɪmət/
- Articulations: Articulates with five bones: the lunate proximally the fourth and fifth metacarpals distally the triquetrum medially the capitate laterally

Identifiers
- Latin: os hamatum
- MeSH: D051225
- TA98: A02.4.08.012
- TA2: 1259
- FMA: 23730

The hamate bone (from Latin hamatus, 'hooked'), or unciform bone (from Latin uncus, 'hook'), Latin os hamatum and occasionally abbreviated as just hamatum, is a bone in the human wrist readily distinguishable by its wedge shape and a hook-like process ("hamulus") projecting from its palmar surface.

== Structure ==
The hamate is an irregularly shaped carpal bone found within the hand. The hamate is found within the distal row of carpal bones, and abuts the metacarpals of the little finger and ring finger.

Adjacent to the hamate on the ulnar side, and slightly proximal and ulnar to it, is the pisiform bone. Adjacent on the radial side is the capitate, and proximal is the lunate bone.

Hamate fractures are common in athletes who handle sticks or clubs, such as baseball players, golfers, and tennis players.

=== Surfaces ===
The hamate bone has six surfaces:

- The superior part, of the apex of the wedge, is narrow, convex, smooth, and articulates with the lunate.
- The inferior articulates with the fourth and fifth metacarpal bones, by concave facets which are separated by a ridge.
- The dorsal is triangular and rough for ligamentous attachment.
- The palmar presents, at its lower and ulnar side, a curved, hook-like process, the hamulus, directed forward and laterally.
- The medial articulates with the triangular bone by an oblong facet, cut obliquely from above, downward and medialward.
- The lateral articulates with the capitate by its upper and posterior part, the remaining portion being rough, for the attachment of ligaments.

=== Hook ===
The hook of hamate (Latin: hamulus) is found at the proximal, ulnar side of the hamate bone. The hook is a curved, hook-like process that projects 1–2 mm distally and radially. The ulnar nerve hooks around the hook of hamate as it crosses towards the medial side of hand.

The hook forms the ulnar border of the carpal tunnel, and the radial border for Guyon's canal. Numerous structures attach to it, including ligaments from the pisiform, the transverse carpal ligament, and the tendon of flexor carpi ulnaris.

Its medial surface gives origin to the flexor digiti minimi brevis and opponens digiti minimi; its lateral side is grooved for the passage of the flexor tendons into the palm of the hand.

=== Development ===
The ossification of the hamate starts at the sixth month of life on average. The said bone does not fully ossify until about the 15th year of life.

=== Other animals ===
The bone is also found in many other mammals, and is homologous with the "fourth distal carpal" of reptiles and amphibians.

== Function ==
The carpal bones function as a unit to provide a bony superstructure for the hand. It forms a concave palmar arch that helps create the carpal tunnel and acts as an attachment site for ligaments and muscles involved in grip and muscle control. The flexor retinaculum of the hand and muscles of the hypothenar eminence attach to the hook of the hamate, which helps to stabilize the ulnar border of the carpal tunnel and form Guyon's Canal.

== Clinical significance ==
The hamate bone is the bone most commonly fractured when a golfer hits the ground hard with a golf club on the downswing or a hockey player hits the ice with a slap shot. The fracture is usually a hairline fracture, commonly missed on normal X-rays. Symptoms are pain aggravated by gripping, tenderness over the hamate and symptoms of irritation of the ulnar nerve. This is characterized by numbness and weakness of the fifth digit with partial involvement of the fourth digit as well, the "ulnar 1½ fingers".

The hook of hamate is particularly prone to fracture-related complications such as non-union due to its tenuous blood supply.

It is also a common injury in baseball players. Several professional baseball players have had the bone removed during the course of their careers. This condition has been called "Wilson's Wrist".

The calcification of the hamate bone is seen on X-rays during puberty and is sometimes used in orthodontics to determine if an adolescent patient is suitable for orthognathic intervention (i.e. before or at their growth spurt).

== Etymology ==
The etymology derives from the Latin hamatus "hooked," from hamus which means "hook".

== Additional images ==
Position of hamate bone (shown in red). Left hand. Animation.

Hamate bone of the left hand. The hook-like process is called hamulus.

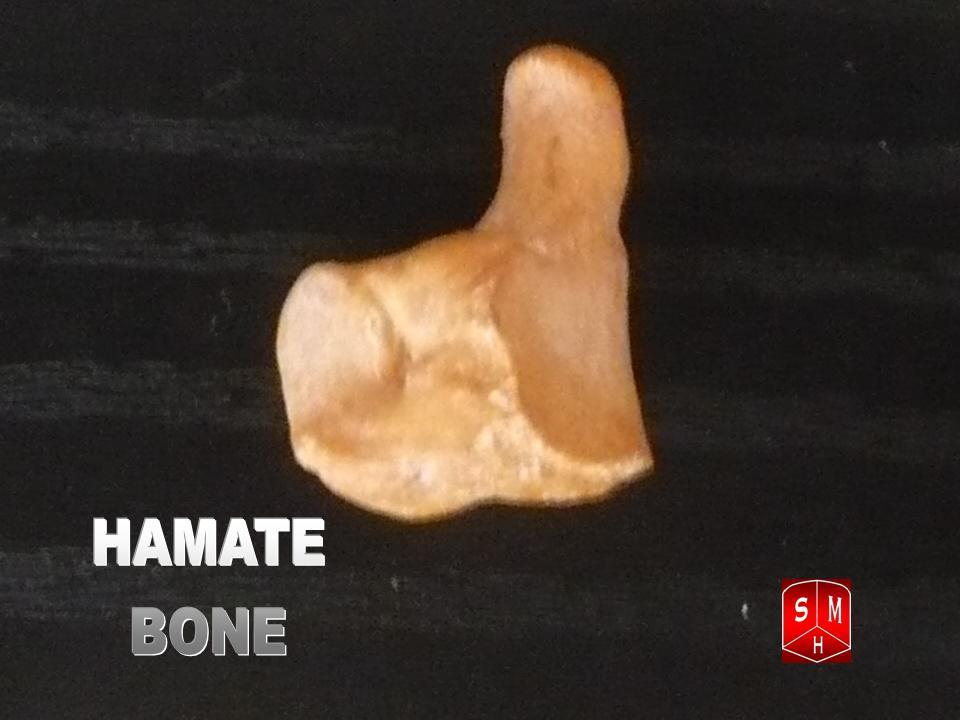
Hamate bone.

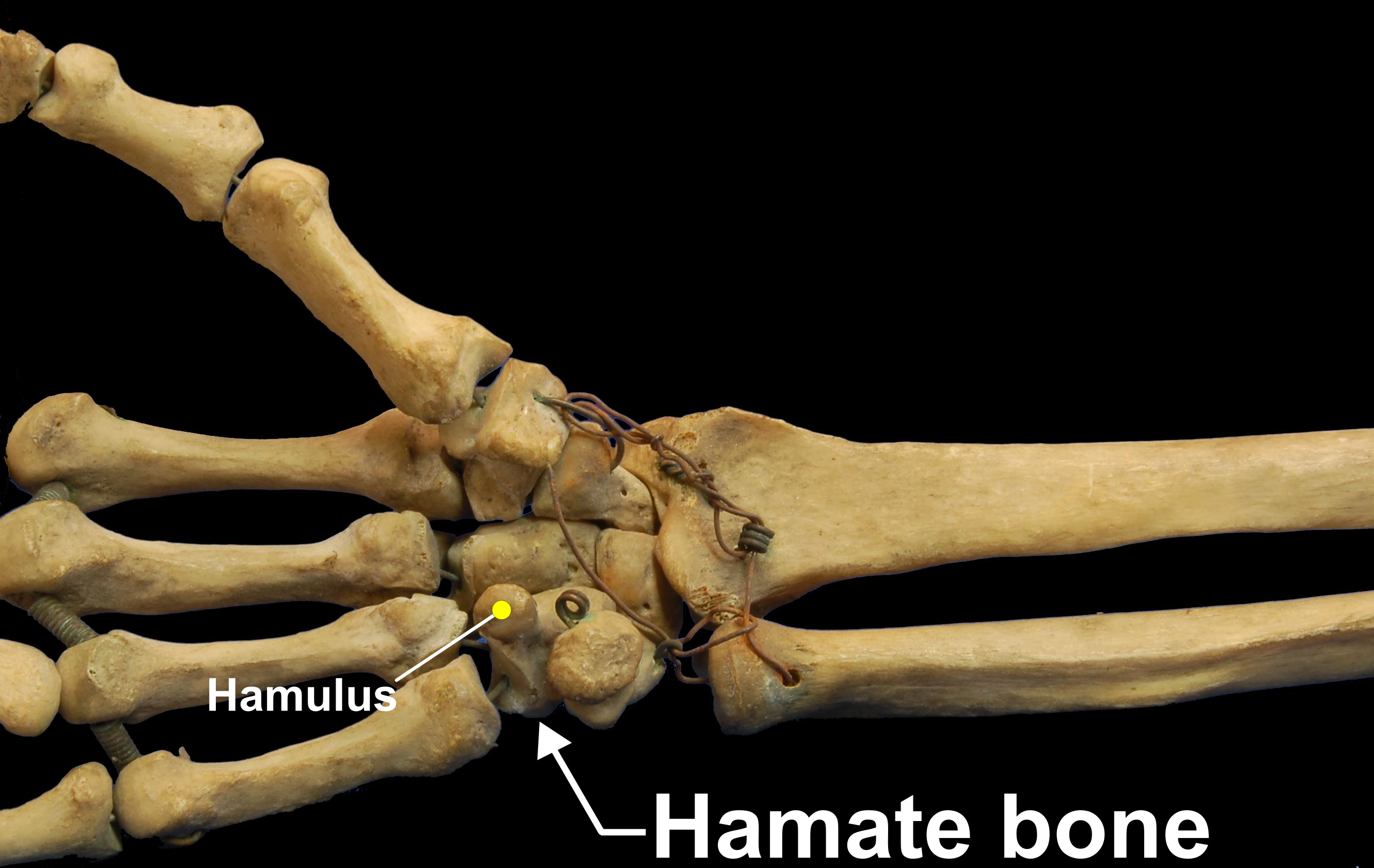
Right hand anterior view (palmar view). Thumb on top.

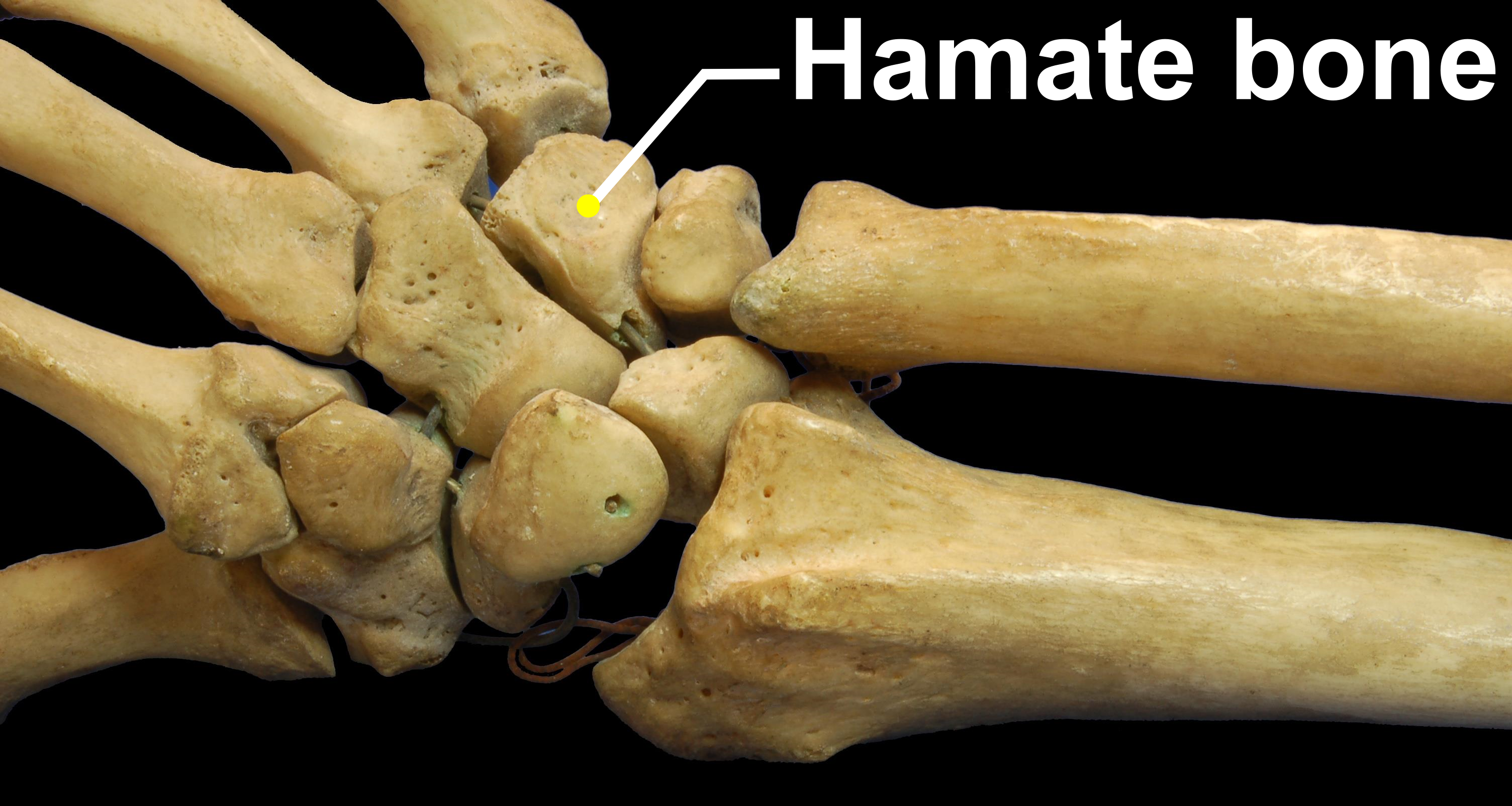
Right hand posterior view (dorsal view). Thumb on bottom.

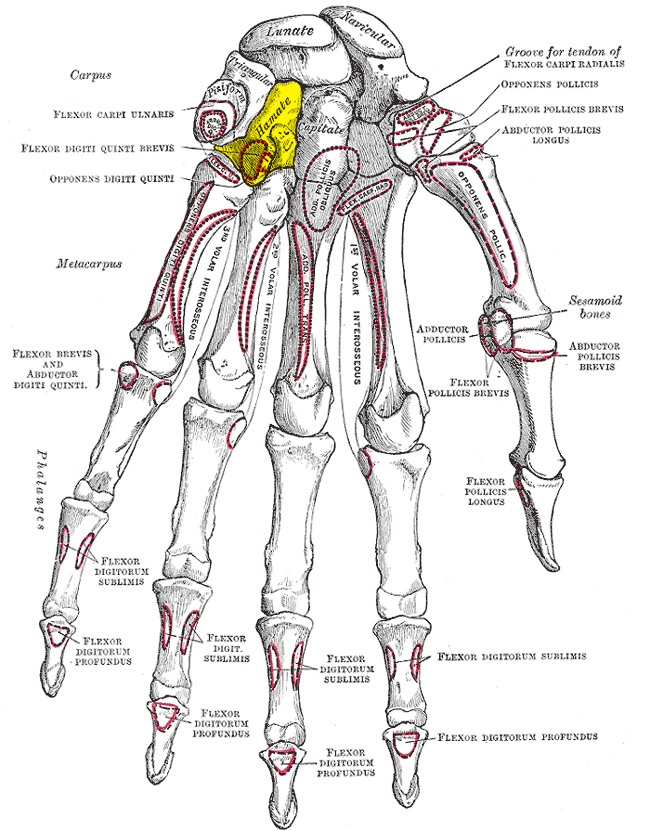
Bones of the left hand. Palmar surface. Hamate shown in yellow.

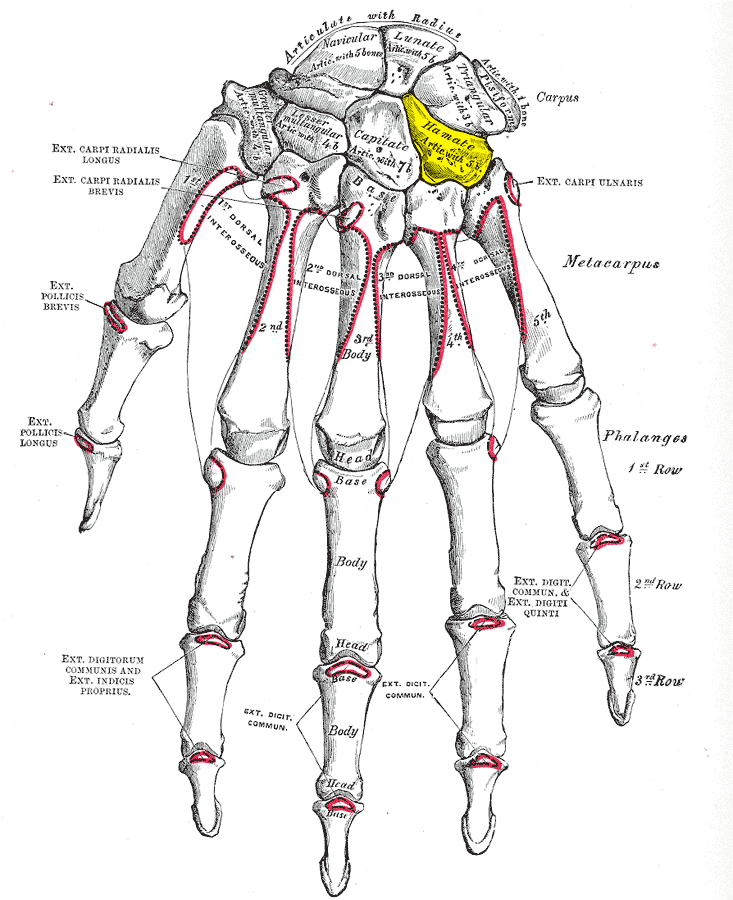
Bones of the left hand. Dorsal surface. Hamate shown in yellow.

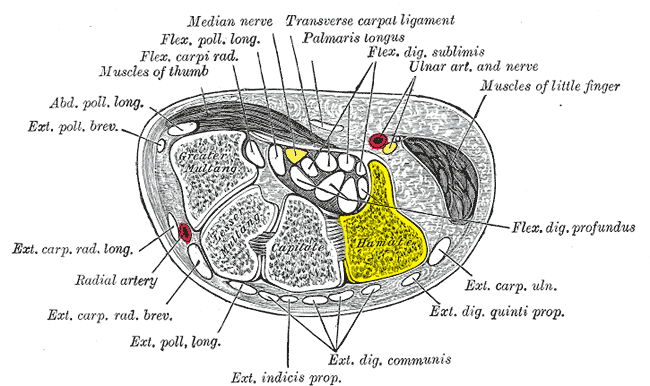
Transverse section across the wrist and digits. Hamate shown in yellow.

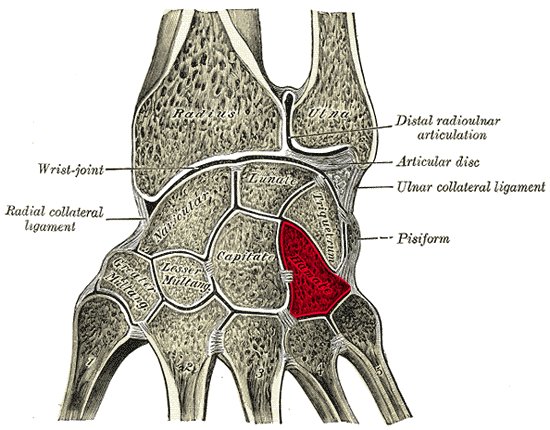
Cross section of wrist (thumb on left). Hamate shown in red.

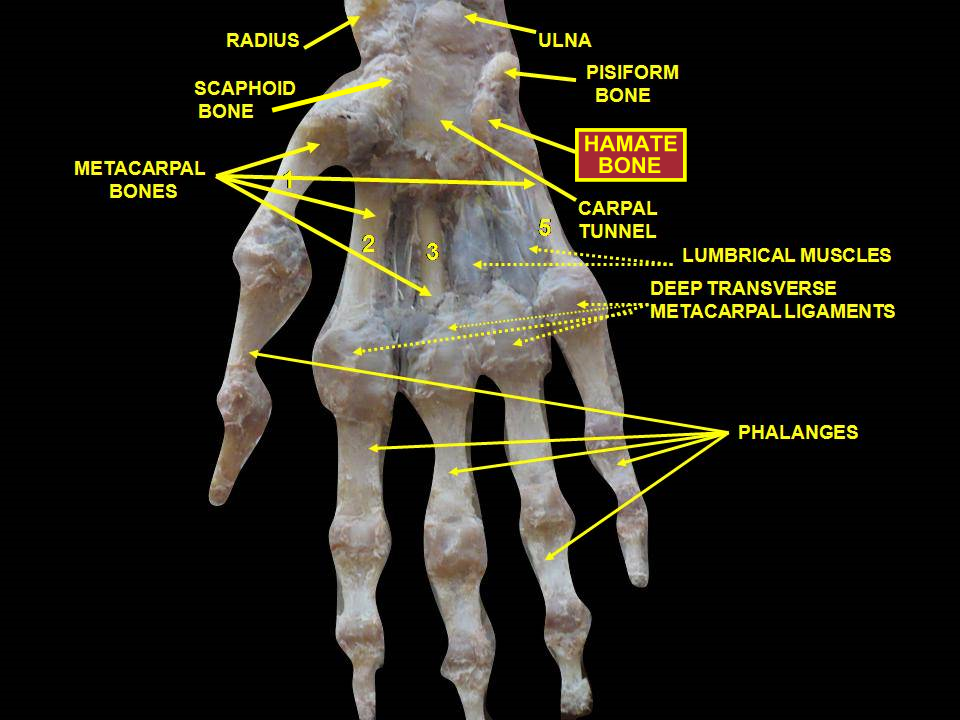
Right wrist joint. Deep dissection. Anterior (palmar) view.

== See also ==
- Carpal bone
- Hypothenar hammer syndrome
