= Capitate bone =

Carpal bone in the wrist

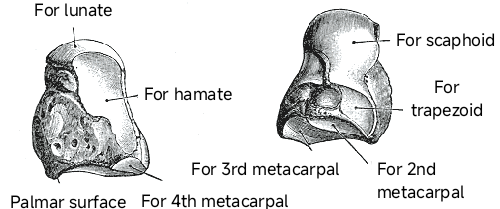
- The right capitate bone. Left: medial surface (little-finger-side surface). Right: lateral surface (thumb-side surface)

Details
- Pronunciation: /ˈkæpɪteɪt/
- Part of: Carpal bones of the hand

Identifiers
- Latin: os capitatum; os magnum
- MeSH: D051224
- TA98: A02.4.08.011
- TA2: 1258
- FMA: 23727

The capitate bone, also known as os magnum, is a bone in the human wrist found in the center of the carpal bone region, located at the distal end of the radius and ulna bones. It articulates with the third metacarpal bone (the middle finger) and forms the third carpometacarpal joint. The capitate bone is the largest of the carpal bones in the human hand. It presents, above, a rounded portion or head, which is received into the concavity formed by the scaphoid and lunate bones; a constricted portion or neck; and below this, the body. The bone is also found in many other mammals, and is homologous with the "third distal carpal" of reptiles and amphibians.

== Structure ==
The capitate is the largest carpal bone found within the hand. The capitate is found within the distal row of carpal bones. The capitate lies directly adjacent to the metacarpal of the ring finger on its distal surface, has the hamate on its ulnar surface and trapezoid on its radial surface, and abuts the lunate and scaphoid proximally.

=== Surfaces ===
The proximal surface is round, smooth, and articulates with the lunate bone.

The distal surface is divided by two ridges into three facets, for articulation with the second, third, and fourth metacarpal bones, that for the third being the largest.

The dorsal surface is broad and rough.

The palmar surface is narrow, rounded, and rough, for the attachment of ligaments and a part of the adductor pollicis muscle.

The lateral surface articulates with the lesser multangular by a small facet at its anterior inferior angle, behind which is a rough depression for the attachment of an interosseous ligament. Above this is a deep, rough groove, forming part of the neck, and serving for the attachment of ligaments; it is bounded superiorly by a smooth, convex surface, for articulation with the scaphoid bone.

The medial surface articulates with the hamate bone by a smooth, concave, oblong facet, which occupies its posterior and superior parts; it is rough in front, for the attachment of an interosseous ligament.

=== Variation ===
The capitate bone variably articulates with the metacarpal of the index finger. However, its normal articulation is with the middle finger.

=== Development ===
The ossification of capitate starts at the third month of life on average.

== Function ==
The carpal bones function as a unit to provide a bony superstructure for the hand. They allow movements of the wrist from side to side (medial to lateral) as well as up and down (anterior to posterior). H. A. Harris wrote in the British Medical Journal in 1944 that "the strength of construction of the hand in a man is concentrated in the radius, thumb, and index and middle fingers." Therefore, the capitate is larger to support the strength and stress that the middle finger undergoes.

== Clinical significance ==
A capitate fracture accounts for 1.3% of all wrist fractures. Isolated fractures of the capitate comprise only 0.3% and are often non-displaced. This is since the capitate is at the centre of the carpal region and is therefore quite well protected. Capitate fractures occur together with fractures of another carpal bone, the scaphoid.

Various mechanisms for fractures of the capitate have been postulated. Adler et al. described three mechanisms—the first is direct trauma to the dorsal surface of the bone, the second is fall on the palm with the wrist in forced extension and the third is fall on the forcefully flexed hand; the second being the most frequent and the third rarest.

In the case of an acute capitate fracture where there is X-ray evidence of excellent alignment of the fracture fragments, the attending doctor will immobilise the wrist in a plaster or lightweight wrist brace. Once the cast has been removed, the patient begins physiotherapy to regain the range of movement of the wrist joint and strength in the muscles involved.

If X-rays show that the capitate fracture fragments are out of alignment, surgery is indicated. A surgeon can use small compression screws or K-wires to unite the two pieces of bone. The headless compression screw has advantage over the K-wire as it provides compression across the fracture site and allows early motion. It may be the case that the ligament between the сapitate and the scaphoid bone is also injured; if so, this would be repaired at the same time.

Because the capitate has a poor blood supply there are sometimes complications with the healing process. This may manifest itself as a diffuse ache in the wrist upon activity, and can persist for many months. This is due to a breakdown of the capitate caused by the lack of blood supply and healing (avascular necrosis). Nonunion has been reported as the most common complication; 19.6% to 56% in isolated capitate fractures. Early diagnosis is key to preventing this.

== Etymology ==
The name of the bone derives from Latin: capitātus 'having a head', from Latin: capit- 'head'.

== Additional images ==
Position of capitate bone (shown in red). Left hand. Animation.

Capitate bone of the left hand. Close up. Animation.

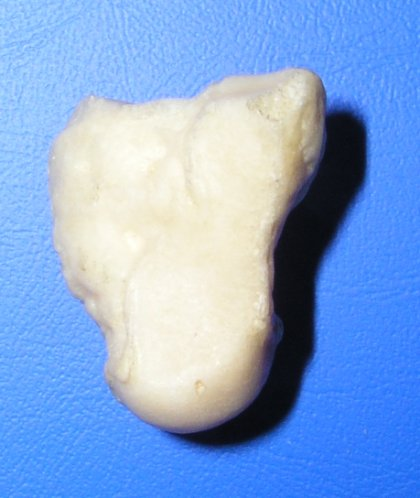
Capitate bone of the left hand. Ulnar surface (little-finger-side surface)

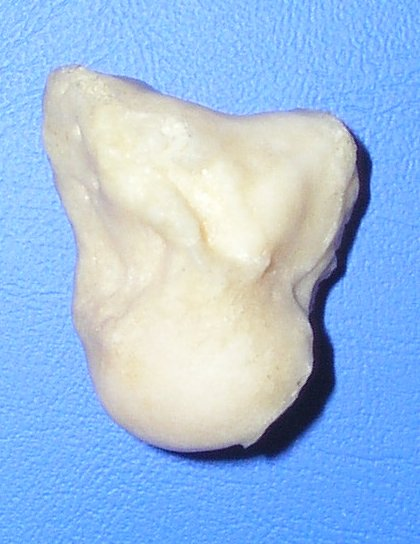
Capitate bone of the left hand. Radial surface (thumb-side surface)

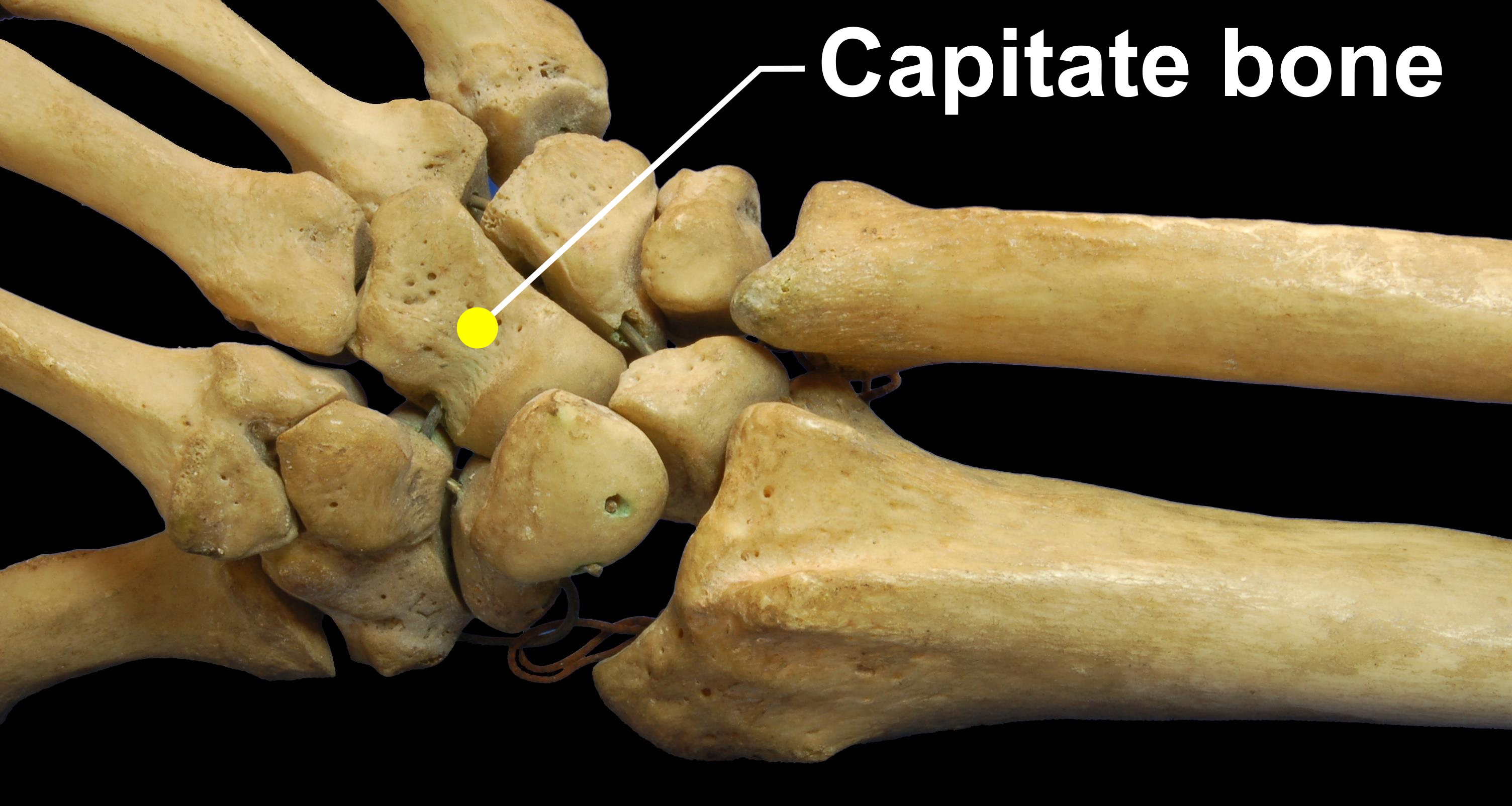
Right hand posterior view (dorsal view). Thumb on bottom.

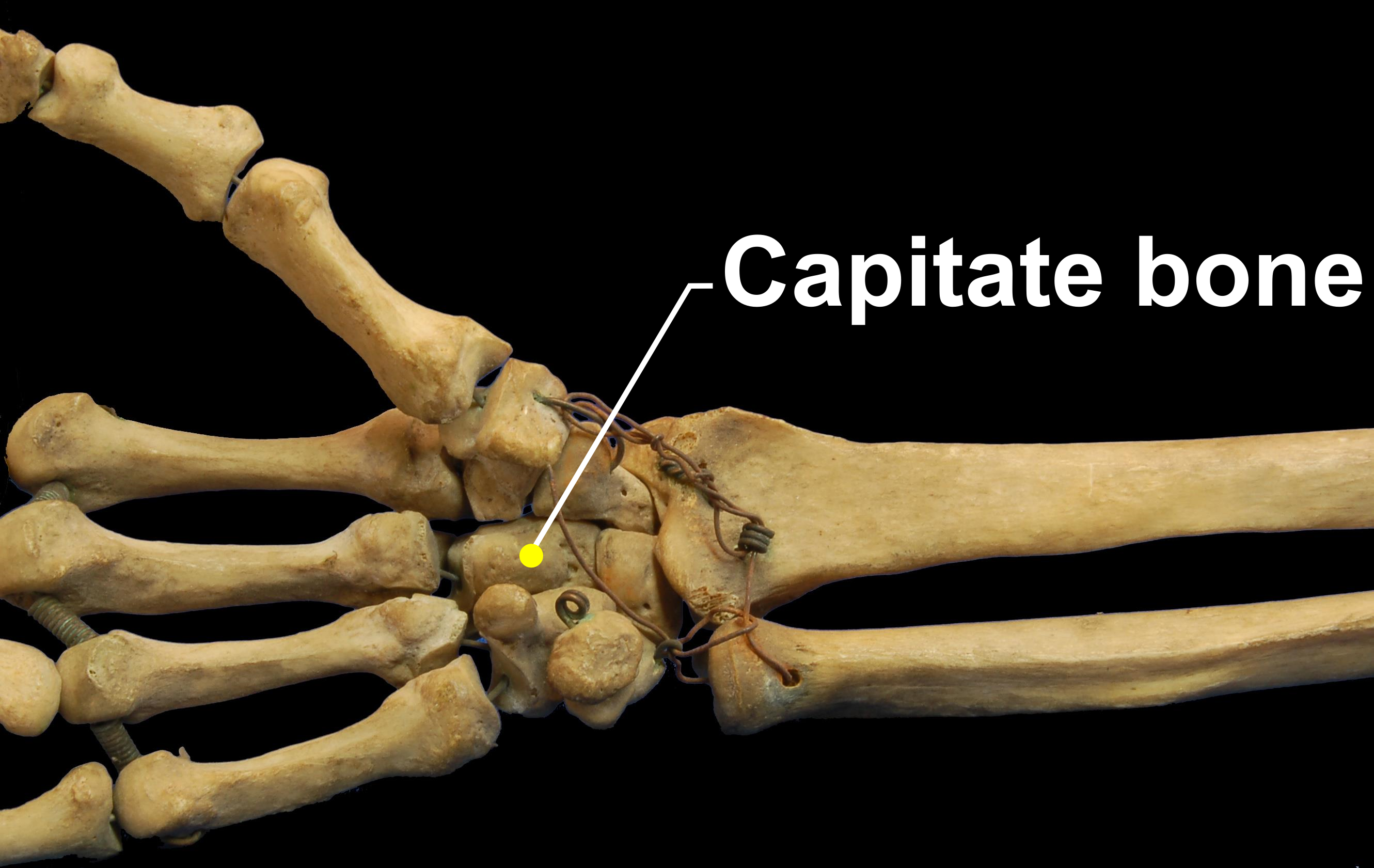
Right hand anterior view (palmar view). Thumb on top.

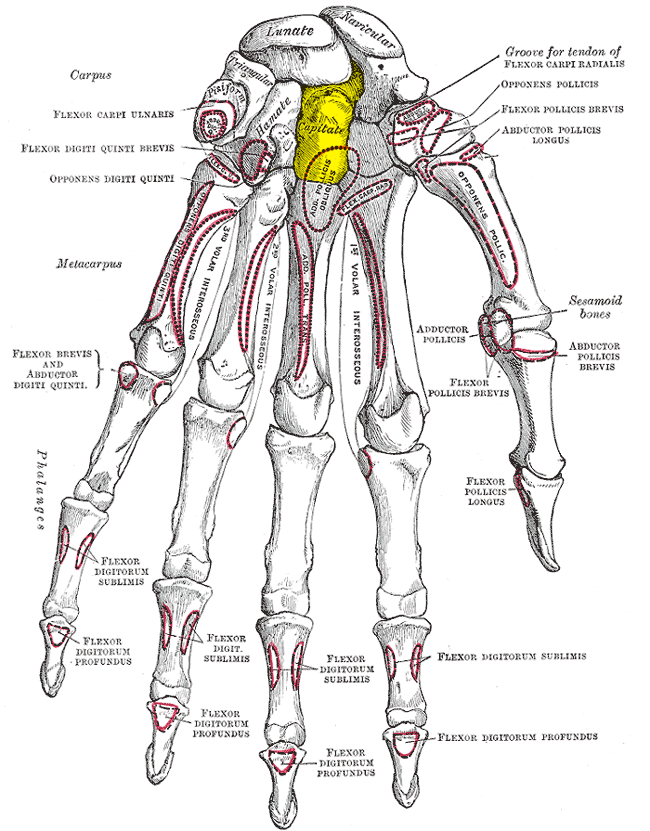
Capitate bone shown in yellow. Left hand. Palmar surface.

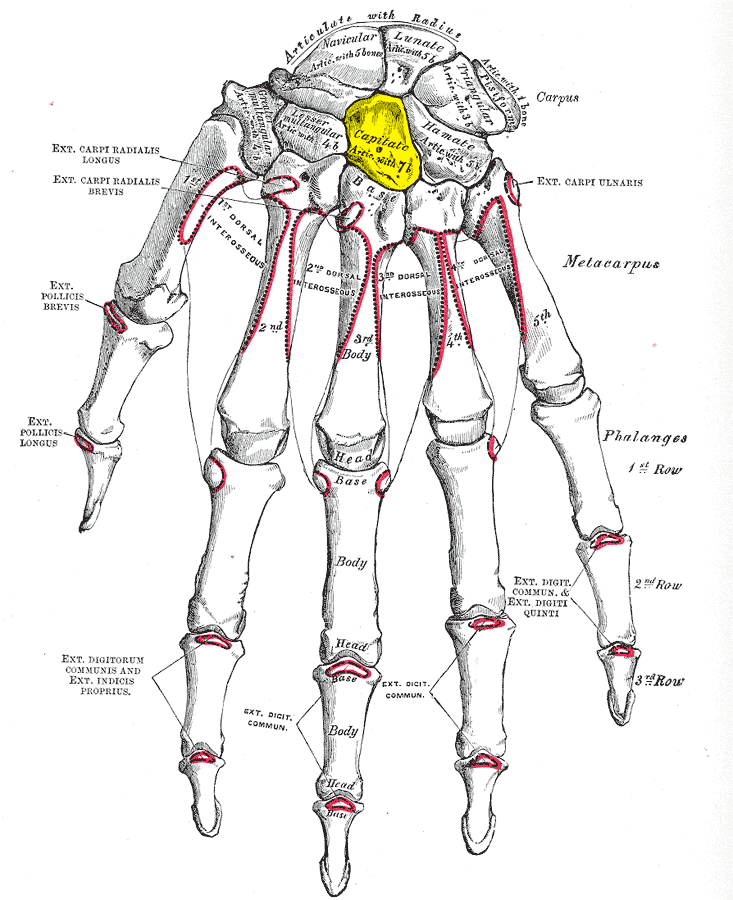
Capitate bone shown in yellow. Left hand. Dorsal surface.

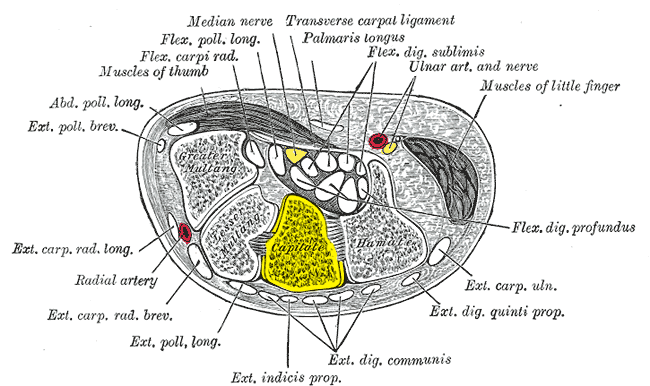
Transverse section across the wrist (palm on top, thumb on left). Capitate bone shown in yellow.

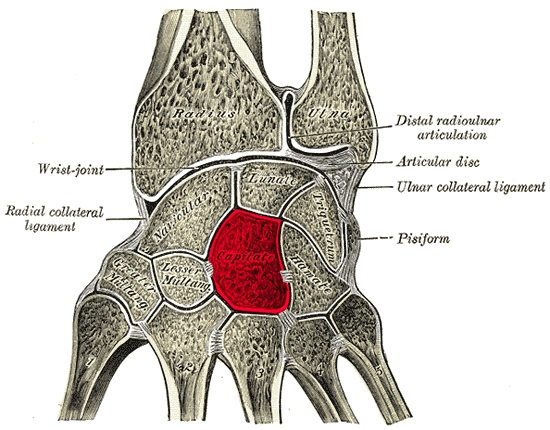
Cross section of wrist (thumb on left). Capitate shown in red.

== See also ==
- Carpal bone

== Sources ==
- Saladin, Kenneth S. "The Skeletal System." Anatomy and Physiology. 7th ed. New York: McGraw-Hill, 2015. N. pag. Print.
- Harris, H. A. "Fractures Of The Carpal Bones." The British Medical Journal 2.4367 (1944): 381. JSTOR. Web. 28 Nov. 2016.
