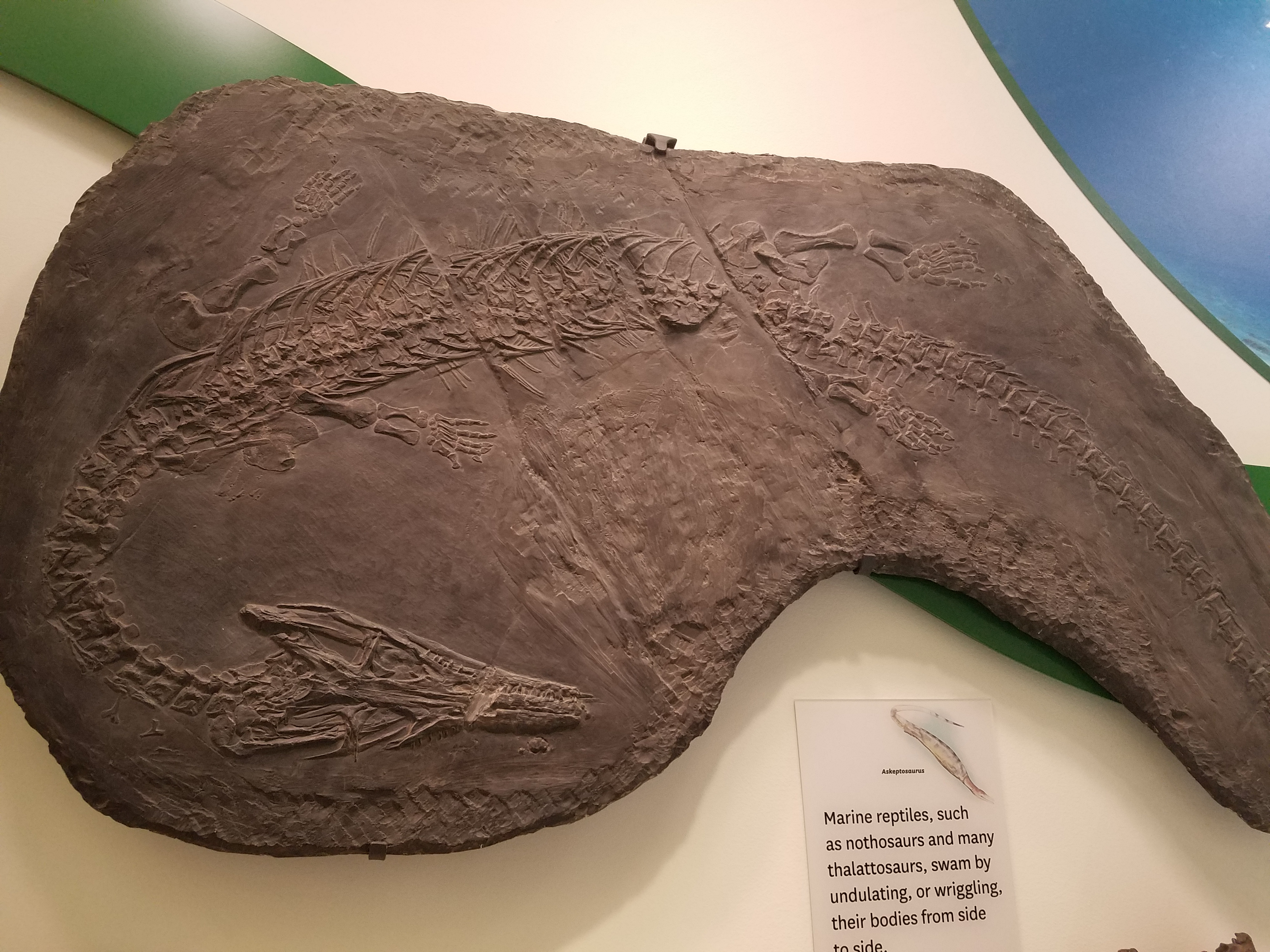
- A cast of specimen MSNM V456

Scientific classification
- Kingdom: Animalia
- Phylum: Chordata
- Class: Reptilia
- Order: †Thalattosauria
- Family: †Askeptosauridae
- Genus: †Askeptosaurus; Nopcsa, 1925
- Species: †A. italicus

Binomial name
- †Askeptosaurus italicus Nopcsa, 1925

= Askeptosaurus =

Askeptosaurus Temporal range: Middle Triassic, 247–225 Ma

Extinct genus of reptiles

Askeptosaurus is an extinct genus of askeptosauroid, a marine reptile from the extinct order Thalattosauria. Askeptosaurus is known from several well-preserved fossils found in Middle Triassic marine strata in what is now Italy and Switzerland.

== History of discovery ==
Askeptosaurus, and its only known species Askeptosaurus italicus, were first named and described in 1925 by Hungarian paleontologist Franz Nopcsa von Felső-Szilvás. It was most recently redescribed by Dr. Johannes Müller in 2005. Askeptosaurus is known from several disarticulated and articulated skeletons preserved at the MSNM (Museo Civico di Storia Naturale di Milano) in Milan, Italy, and the PIMUZ (Paläontologisches Institut und Museum der Universität Zürich, Paleontological Institute and Museum of the University of Zurich) in Zurich, Switzerland. These specimens were discovered in the Grenzbitumenzone of Monte San Giorgio, a UNESCO World Heritage Site on the Swiss-Italian border. Also known as the Besano Formation in Italy, the Grenzbitumenzone has produced many well-preserved fossils from the Anisian-Ladinian boundary within the Middle Triassic.

== Description ==
Askeptosaurus was a fairly large thalattosaur, with a skull 26 centimetres (10 inches) in length, and a total length up to 3 metres (9.8 feet). Like other askeptosauroids, it had a long neck, a very long tail, and small but well-developed limbs with five independent digits.

=== Skull ===
==== Cranium ====
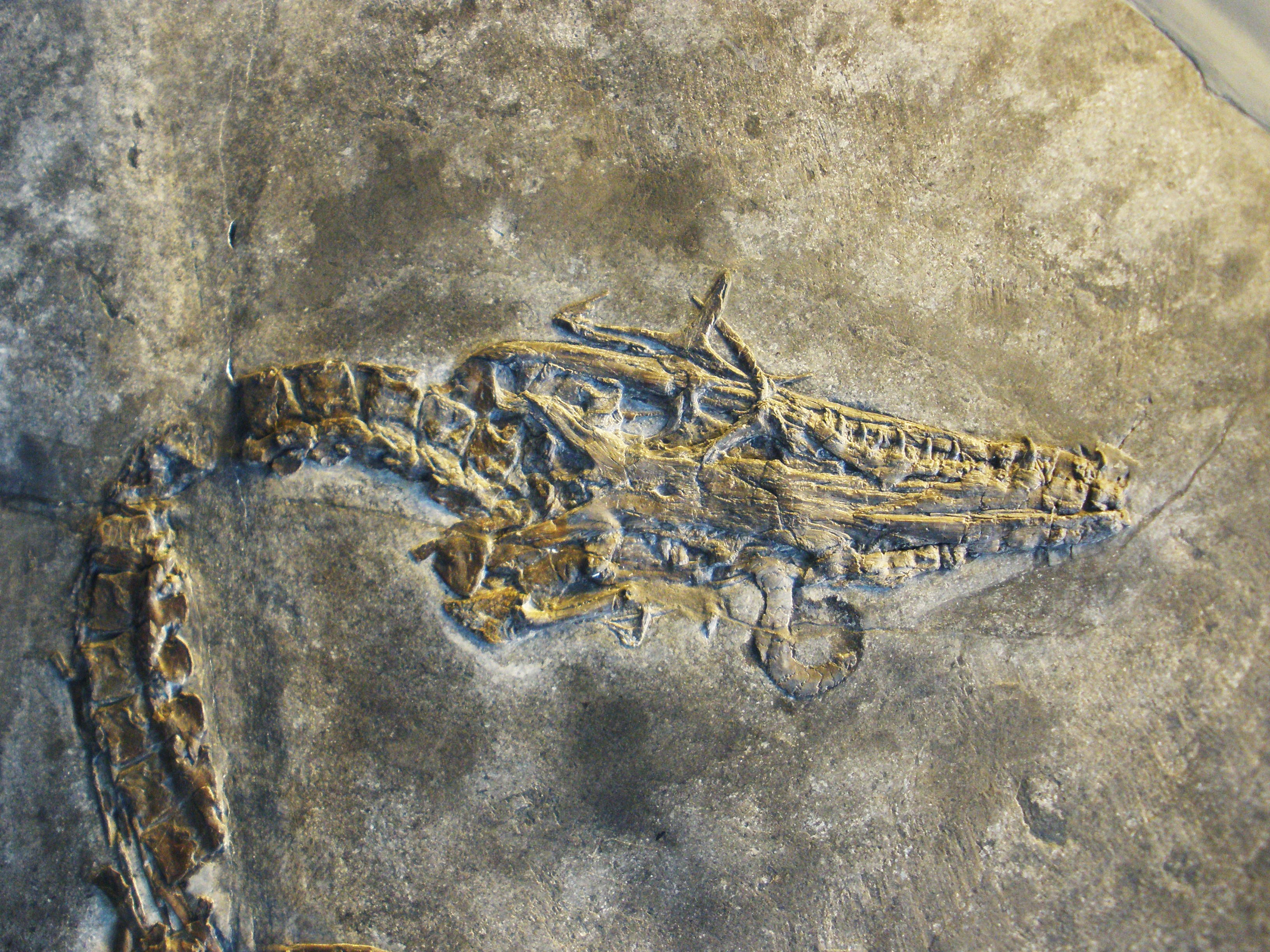
The skull and a small part of the neck of specimen PIMUZ T 4831

The skull was low and somewhat broad at the back, though the snout was long and slender. Nearly half of the snout is formed by the large premaxillae, which send back a long triangular projection into the frontals along the midline of the snout. Each premaxilla has up to 12 sharp and slightly curved teeth. They are implanted in a pleurothecodont manner, meaning that they lie in shallow sockets along a groove which has a lowered edge on the lingual (tongue) side of the tooth row. The premaxilla is followed by the low and smaller maxilla, and an elongated naris (nostril) is present at the border between the two bones. The maxilla has 16 teeth, which are similar to those of the premaxilla, albeit slightly smaller. Unlike thalattosauroids, the teeth have the same general shape and there is no diastema (gap) between the premaxillary and maxillary tooth rows. Like other thalattosaurs, the nasals are separated from each other by midline projections of the premaxilla and frontal. The nasals have a small contribution to the border of the naris, and the sharp rear tip of each nasal projects into the frontal. Apart from the triangular notches incised by the premaxillae and nasals, the frontals have a simple and subrectangular form.

Two small bones, the lacrimal and prefrontal, lie in front of the large orbit (eye socket). The presence of a separate lacrimal is a plesiomorphic (ancestral) trait only found in Askeptosaurus among thalattosaurs. Askeptosaurus is also unique in how its lacrimal has a slight contact with the frontal between the nasal and prefrontal. The posterodorsal (rear-upper) edge of the orbit has two more bones, the large and multi-pronged postorbital and the much smaller postfrontal. Once again, Askeptosaurus retains the plesiomorphic condition, since in other thalattosaurs these bones fuse into a single postorbitofrontal. The parietals, which lie at the rear of the skull roof, send out sprawling projections over the braincase. A slit-like upper temporal fenestra develops between the parietal and postorbital, while a circular pineal foramen is positioned near the parietal's suture with the frontal.

The rear branch of each parietal host two slender bones, the squamosal and supratemporal. The supratemporal is slightly longer while the squamosal has a small but distinct downward projection at its rear tip. The lower rear edge of the skull has a large and rectangular lower temporal fenestra, which is not closed from below due to the absence of a quadratojugal. Slender branches of the jugal form the entire lower edge of the orbit, and about a third of the lower edge of the lower temporal fenestra. The rear edge of the skull is formed by a large quadrate, which has broad upper and lower extents, and concave rear and lateral edges.

==== Palate, braincase, and lower jaw ====
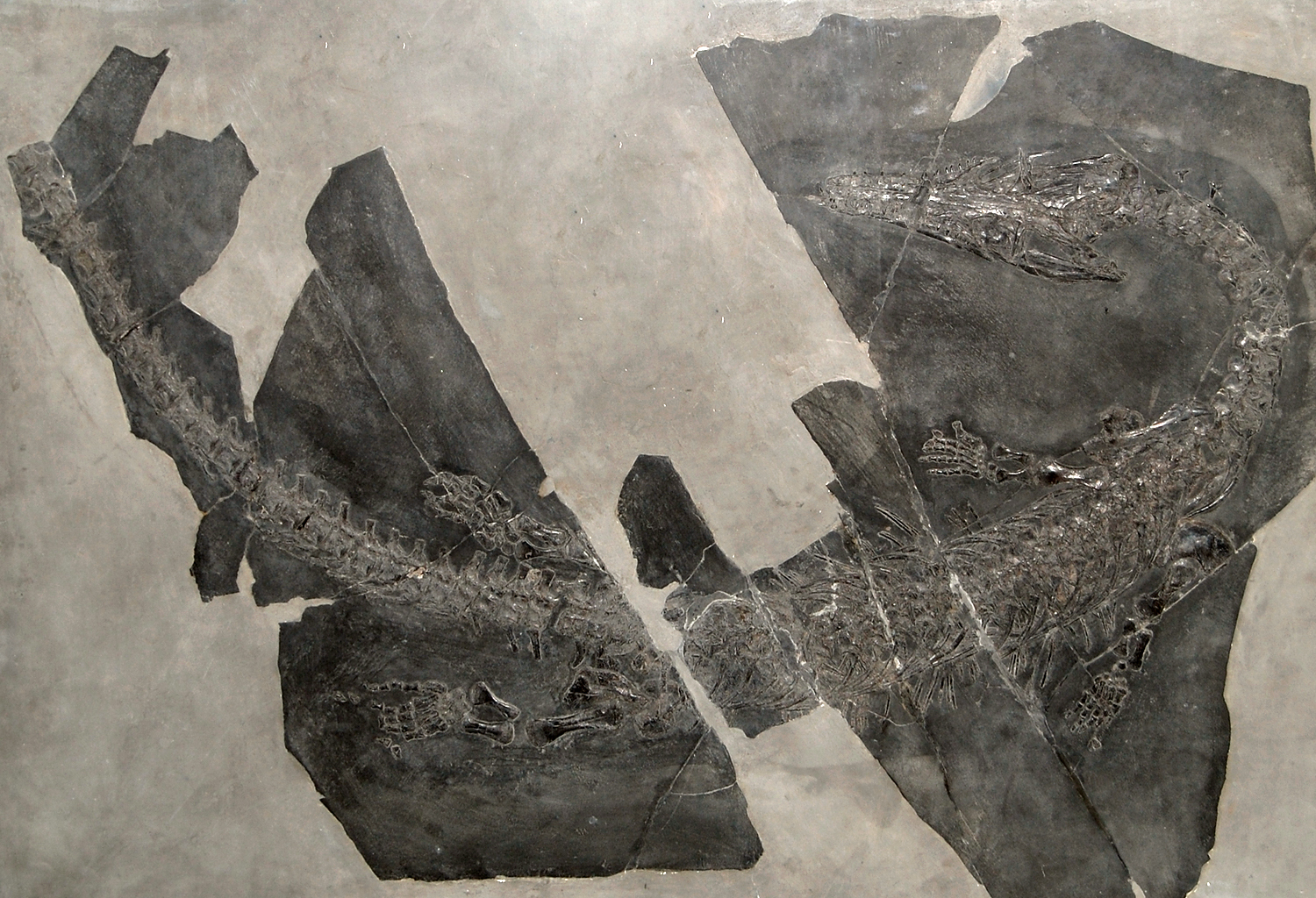
Specimen MSNM V456, one of the most complete fossils of Askeptosaurus italicus

Unlike thalattosauroids, the palate (roof of the mouth) was completely toothless. The vomer is long and slender, forming the lower midline of the snout. The succeeding pterygoids are larger, with a pair of sharp muscle scars at their lateral extent. A T-shaped ectopterygoid forms a strut between the pterygoid and the jugal, while the less complete palatine connects the pterygoid to the maxilla.

The upper part of the braincase is poorly known, but the lower part is less obscure. The parabasisphenoid (lower plate) sends forward an elongated cultriform process. Further back, each side has a bulbous basipterygoid process (which connects to the palate), deep grooves for arteries and nerves, and finally a sharp posterolateral (rear-outer) tip. The parabasisphenoid is followed by a broad and fairly simple basioccipital (lower rear plate), which forms the occipital condyle. The foramen magnum is flanked by distinct exoccipitals, which are connected (but not fused) to elongated and posterolaterally directed opisthotics. The supraoccipital, which roofs the foramen magnum, has a strong fan-shaped crest on it.

The lower jaw is slender, with 20 teeth on the dentary which are similar to those of the upper jaw. The dentary sheaths over the entire splenial and much of the angular, making it by far the longest bone when the jaw is seen in lateral view. A sharp and subtriangular coronoid rises up in the rear half of the jaw, above the low but elongated surangular. The surangular lacks a retroarticular process behind the jaw joint, but it does have sharp crest in its rear half. The splenial and prearticular are the most prominent parts of the jaw when seen in medial view.

=== Postcrania ===
==== Vertebrae ====
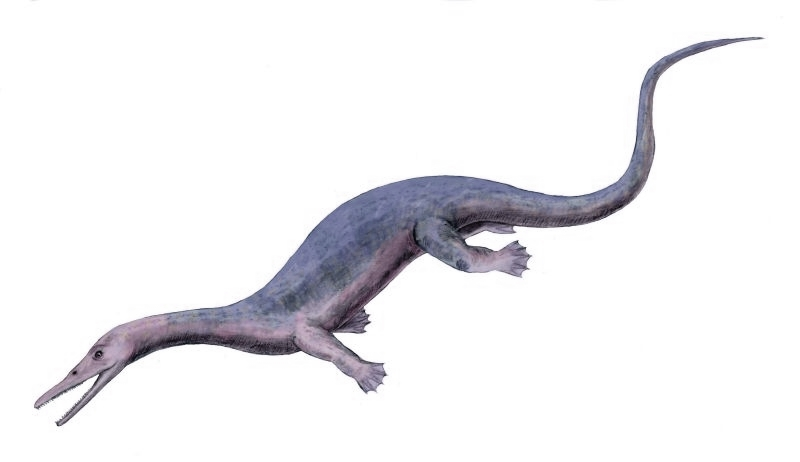
Life restoration

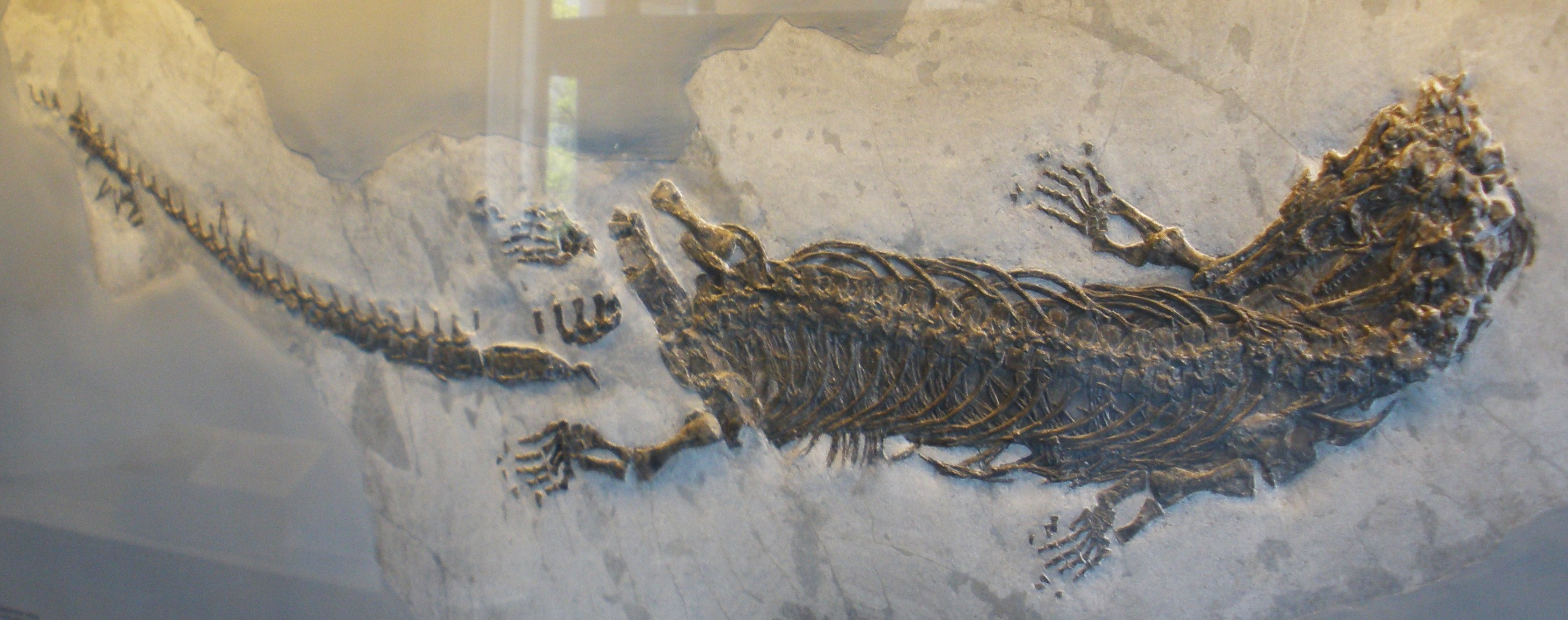
Specimen PIMUZ T 4846 exhibited in the NMZ

All of the vertebrae were amphicoelous, with concave front and rear faces of their respective centrum (main body). The neck was fairly elongated, with 13 cervical (neck) vertebrae. The components of the atlas (atlantal neural arch, intercentrum, and proatlases) were not connected, while the axis had a low and long neural spine and a large single rib facet. The atlantal and axial cervical ribs were small, slender, and single-headed. The other cervicals were slightly longer than tall and connected to small rectangular neural spines. Their double-headed cervical rib facets were originally misinterpreted, with the lower facet reported as connected to a wedge-shaped intercentrum rather than the centrum. Later investigation determined that intercentra were not present and that each side of the centrum had two facets. The cervical ribs in the latter half of the neck increased in length and acquired small additional projections between the joints with the vertebrae.

The 25 dorsal (torso) vertebrae are similar to the cervicals but larger, and they only had single rib facets. Their neural spines are proportionally taller and vertically oriented, though still quite short by thalattosaur standards. The rib facets are directed at a steep diagonal angle towards the anteroventral (front-lower) end of the centrum. Their single-headed ribs were larger and had expanded heads towards the front of the torso, and were gradually smaller towards the hip. Gastralia are slender but poorly studied. The two sacral (hip) vertebrae are also obscure, but their fan-shaped, single-headed ribs were known to connect to the lower part of the centrum. The tail was very long, with at least 60 caudal (tail) vertebrae which were more elongated towards the tip of the tail. The first five caudals had short, single-headed ribs. The first, fourth, and fifth caudal ribs have a curved, tapering form, and the other two have straight ribs with expanded heads. These first few caudals also had straight, vertical neural spines. The rest of the tail had prominent chevrons and neural spines which were shorter and more sharply inclined backwards.

==== Limbs ====
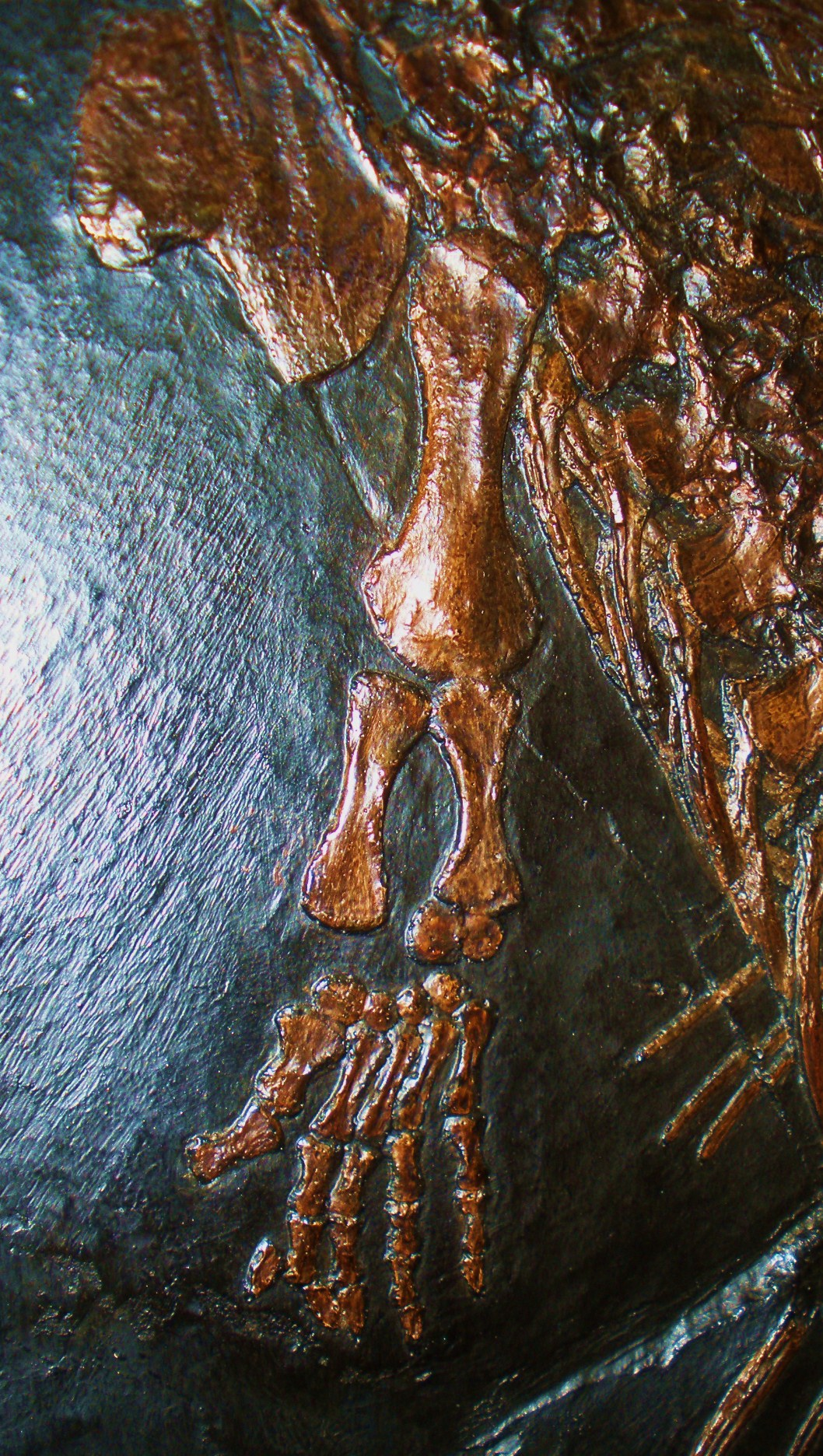
Forelimb of specimen MSNM V456

The pectoral (shoulder) girdle includes an interclavicle, clavicles, scapulae, and coracoids. The scapula and coracoid are broad and rounded, connecting to form a laterally oriented glenoid (shoulder socket). The interclavicle is arrow-shaped, with a very long rear shaft and small lateral projections overlapping the clavicles. The clavicles are curved and slender, connecting the interclavicle to the scapulae. The humerus (forearm) was large and twisted. Its joint surfaces were poorly defined apart from an ectepicondylar groove near the elbow and a small deltopectoral crest near the shoulder. The radius and ulna of the lower arm are smaller bones with a straight and simple form. The radius is slender and tubular, unlike the broader radius of thalattosauroids. The ulna lacks an olecranon process and has a distinct hourglass-shaped form with a constricted shaft. The wrist has six to seven carpal bones including an intermedium, ulnare, and four small distal carpals. The middle three metacarpals of the manus (hand) are slender, metacarpal V is slightly thicker, and metacarpal I is short and massive. The digits are fairly short, with small claws. There is some intraspecific (within-species) variation in the manus, with specimen PIMUZ T 4846 having an extra carpal in the wrist and an extra joint in the third finger, relative to MSNM V456.

The pelvis (hip) contains an ilium, pubis, and ischium and is generally similar to other thalattosaurs. The ilium was deep around the acetabulum (hip) socket, and sends back a long rectangular process at its posterodorsal (upper-rear) corner. The pubis is large and broad in the anteroposterior (front to back) direction and has a concave front edge. The ischium is similarly broad, with a concave posterodorsal edge and other edges which are straighter. There is some uncertainty over the presence of a thyroid fenestra (a gap between the pubes and ischia) based on specimen preservation, but it was probably small or absent. The femur (thigh bone) is the largest limb bone in the skeleton and has a simple, slightly twisted form. The tibia is stout and semi-cylindrical while the fibula is fan-shaped and flattened, expanded near the ankle and narrow near the knee. There were six tarsals in the ankle. They include a large reniform (kidney-shaped) astragalus, a subrectangular calcaneum, and four rounded distal tarsals. The pes (foot) is similar to the manus, though the fifth digit has an additional phalange and a thickly curved metatarsal V.

== Classification ==
Prior to 2005, fossils of Askeptosaurus were rare and the position of Askeptosaurus on the phylogenetic tree had been a heated debate between different research teams. Recent analyses corroborate Renesto's (1992) argument that Endennasaurus is more closely related to Askeptosaurus than to other thalattosaurs. It is now commonly agreed that a monophyletic group is formed by Anshunsaurus and Askeptosaurus. To be more specific, Askeptosaurus belongs to the family Askeptosauridae, a division of the suborder Askeptosauroidea. Within Askeptosauridae, Askeptosaurus is considered to be the sister taxon of Anshunsaurus, from Middle Triassic deposits in Guizhou, China. At present, the Askeptosauroidea is only known from the Alpine Triassic and southern China, and Askeptosaurus represents the oldest record for this clade.

- Askeptosauroidea
  - Endennasaurus
  - Askeptosauridae
    - Anshunsaurus
      - A. huangguoshuensis
      - A. wushaensis
    - - Askeptosaurus italicus

== Paleoecology ==
A. italicus was found in the Middle Triassic of Switzerland and Italy, with most specimens recovered from sites on Monte San Giorgio. It lived alongside many other fish and marine reptiles, including two other genera of thalattosaurs: Clarazia and Hescheleria.
