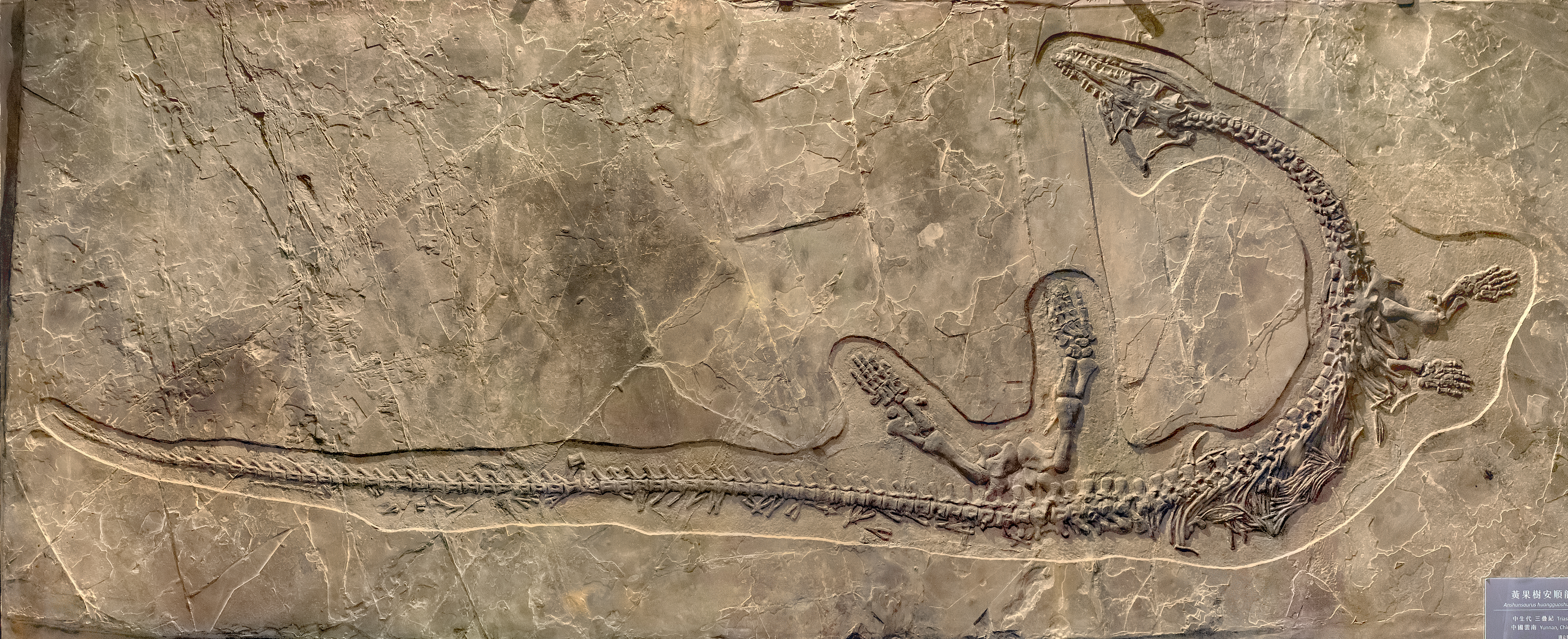
- Fossil specimen of A. huangguoshuensis, National Taiwan Museum

Scientific classification
- Kingdom: Animalia
- Phylum: Chordata
- Class: Reptilia
- Order: †Thalattosauria
- Family: †Askeptosauridae
- Genus: †Anshunsaurus; Liu, 1999

Species
- †A. huangguoshuensis Liu, 1999 (type); †A. wushaensis Rieppel et al., 2006; †A. huangnihensis Cheng et al., 2007

= Anshunsaurus =

Anshunsaurus Temporal range: Middle Triassic, 237–228 Ma

Extinct genus of reptiles

Anshunsaurus is a genus of thalattosaurs within the family Askeptosauridae. Fossils have been found from Middle Triassic deposits in Guizhou, China. Three species are known: the type species A. huangguoshuensis (named in 1999), the slightly older species A. wushaensis (named in 2006), and the species A. huangnihensis (named in 2007).

== Description and species ==
Anshunsaurus was a marine reptile with a long neck, slender skull, and long, paddle-like tail. In comparison to its long trunk, the limbs are very small. Anshunsaurus is characterized by a long jugal bone in the skull, fused postorbital and postfrontal bones around the eyes, a maxilla that forms part of the margin of the eye socket, a humerus with large crests, and a large fibula.

The type species of Anshunsaurus, A. huangguoshuensis, was named in 1999 from the Ladinian or Carnian age Falang Formation in Guanling County. Although several complete skeletons are known, most specimens are crushed in either dorsal (top) or ventral (bottom) view. The holotype of A. huangguoshuensis, IVPP V11835, is preserved in dorsal view while a second specimen, IVPP V11834, is preserved in ventral view. Based on these specimens, A. huangguoshuensis grew to about 3.5 metres (11 ft) in length. Although the tip is not preserved in any specimen, the tail made up at least half of the animal's length. A juvenile specimen of A. huangguoshuensis was described in 2015.

A second species, A. wushaensis, was named in 2006 from Xingyi. A. wushaensis is slightly smaller than A. huangguoshuensis and has a smaller head relative to its body length. It also has shorter neural spines with ridges on their upper surface, a shorter fourth digit on the hand, a well-developed entepicondyle on the humerus, and a shorter jugal bone. A juvenile specimen of A. wushaensis was described in 2007, making Anshunsaurus the only thalattosaur with a known growth series other than Xinpusaurus. The pectoral and pelvic girdles are asymmetrical in this specimen, suggesting that the bones on the left and right sides of the animal did not ossify at the same rate while it was growing.

In 2007 a third species of Anshunsaurus, A. huangnihensis, was described from Xingyi. It is distinguished from the other two species on the basis of the shape of its coracoid, a bone of the pectoral girdle.

== Classification ==
When it was first described in 1999, Anshunsaurus was thought to be a sauropterygian. In 2000, Anshunsaurus was reidentified as a thalattosaur and has remained in this group ever since. It was placed in the family Askeptosauridae along with the genus Askeptosaurus from Europe. Both thalattosaurs belong to Askeptosauroidea, a group characterized by their long necks and narrow skulls. Of the three species of Anshunsaurus, A. huangnihensis shares more features with other thalattosaurs such as Askeptosaurus and Endennasaurus. These features suggest that A. huangnihensis is a transitional form between earlier thalattosaurs and the later species of Anshunsaurus.
