= Lunate bone =

Carpal bone in the human hand

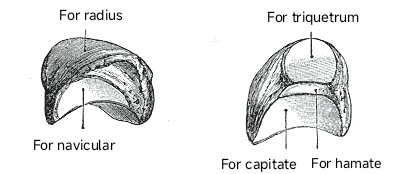
- The right lunate bone. (After Gray.)

Details
- Articulations: Radius proximally capitate and hamate distally scaphoid laterally triquetrum medially triangular fibrocartilage

Identifiers
- Latin: os lunatum
- MeSH: D012667
- TA98: A02.4.08.005
- TA2: 1252
- FMA: 23712

The lunate bone (semilunar bone) is a carpal bone in the human hand. It is distinguished by its deep concavity and crescentic outline. It is situated in the center of the proximal row carpal bones, which lie between the ulna and radius and the hand. The lunate carpal bone is situated between the lateral scaphoid bone and medial triquetral bone.

== Structure ==
The lunate is a crescent-shaped carpal bone found within the hand. The lunate is found within the proximal row of carpal bones. Proximally, it abuts the radius. Laterally, it articulates with the scaphoid bone, medially with the triquetral bone, and distally with the capitate bone. The lunate also articulates on its distal and medial surface with the hamate bone.

The lunate is stabilised by a medial ligament to the scaphoid bone and a lateral ligament to the triquetral bone. Ligaments between the radius and carpal bone also stabilise the position of the lunate, as does its position in the lunate fossa of the radius.

=== Bone ===
The proximal surface of the lunate bone is smooth and convex, articulating with the radius. The lateral surface is flat and narrow, with a crescentic facet for articulation with the scaphoid bone. The medial surface possesses a smooth and quadrilateral facet for articulation with the triquetral bone. The palmar surface is rough, as is the dorsal surface. The dorsal surface is broad and rounded. The distal surface of the bone is deep and concave.

=== Blood supply ===
The lunate receives its blood supply from dorsal and palmar branches.

=== Variation ===
The lunate has a variable shape. About one-third of lunate bones do not possess a medial facet, meaning they do not articulate with the hamate bone. Additionally, in about 20% of people, blood supply may arise from palmar vessels alone.

=== Ossification ===
The ossification of the lunate bone commences between 18 months and 4 years 3 months.

== Function ==
The carpal bones function as a unit to provide a bony superstructure for the hand. As a proximal carpal bone, the lunate is also involved in movement of the wrist.

== Clinical relevance ==
The lunate bone is the most frequently dislocated carpal bone. For its diagnosis, a little-known depression on the dorsal aspect of the wrist, known as the lunate foveola, is used.

- Carpal coalition
- Kienböck's disease
- Teisen classification

== Etymology ==
The name of the lunate bone derives from the "crescent-shaped" (Latin: lunatus), from Latin luna ("moon"), from the bone's resemblance to a crescent moon. In amphibians and reptiles, the bone is instead referred to as the intermedium, because of its position between the other two proximal carpals.

== Additional images ==
Lunate bone of the left hand (shown in red). Animation.

Lunate bone of the left hand. Close up. Animation.

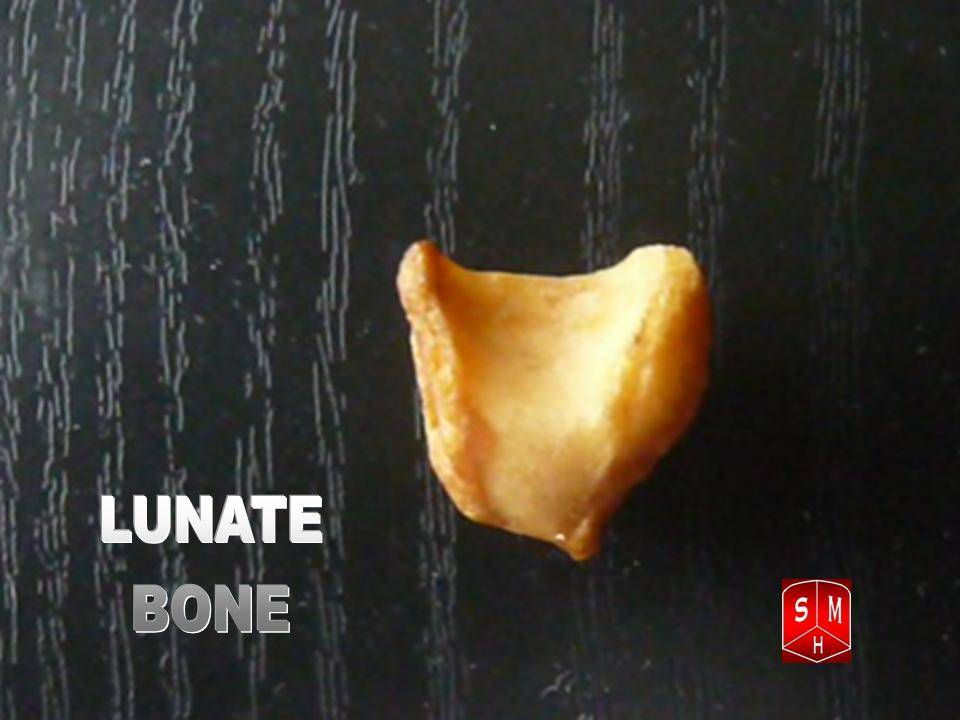
Lunate bone.

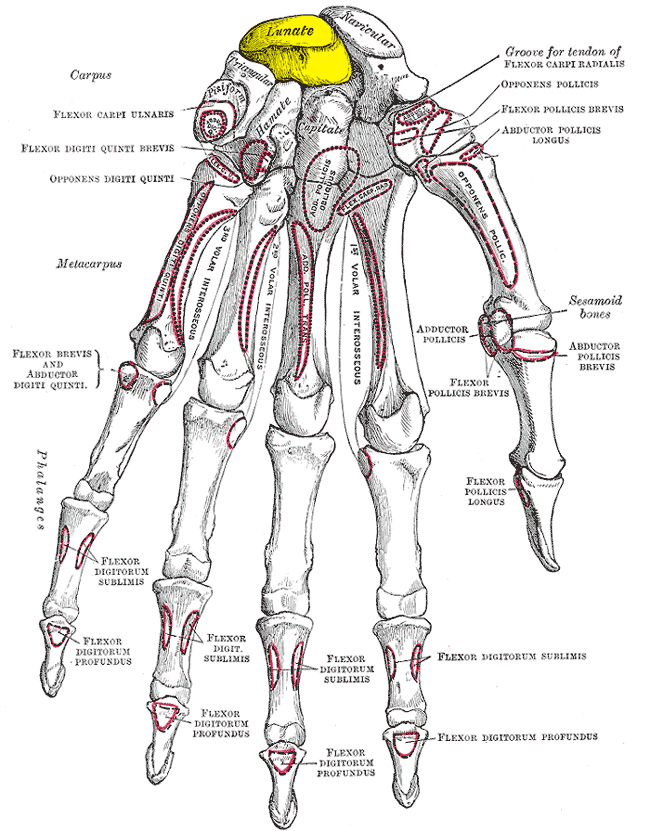
Bones of the left hand. Volar surface.

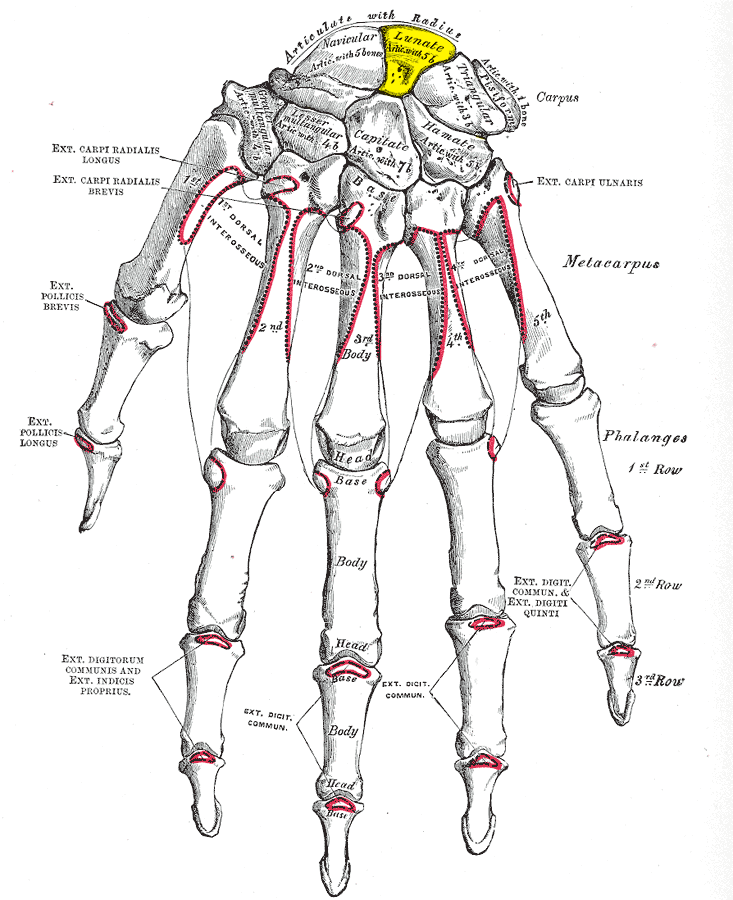
Bones of the left hand. Dorsal surface.

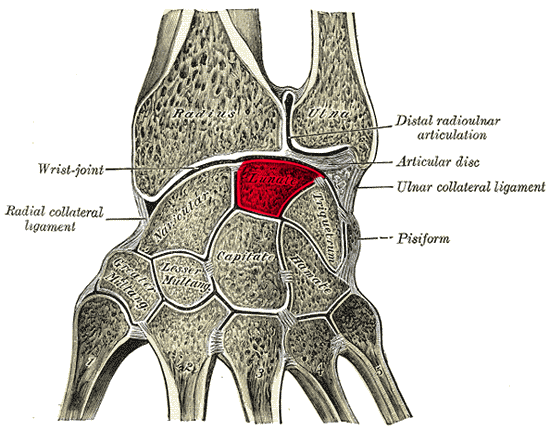
Cross section of wrist (thumb on left). Lunate shown in red.

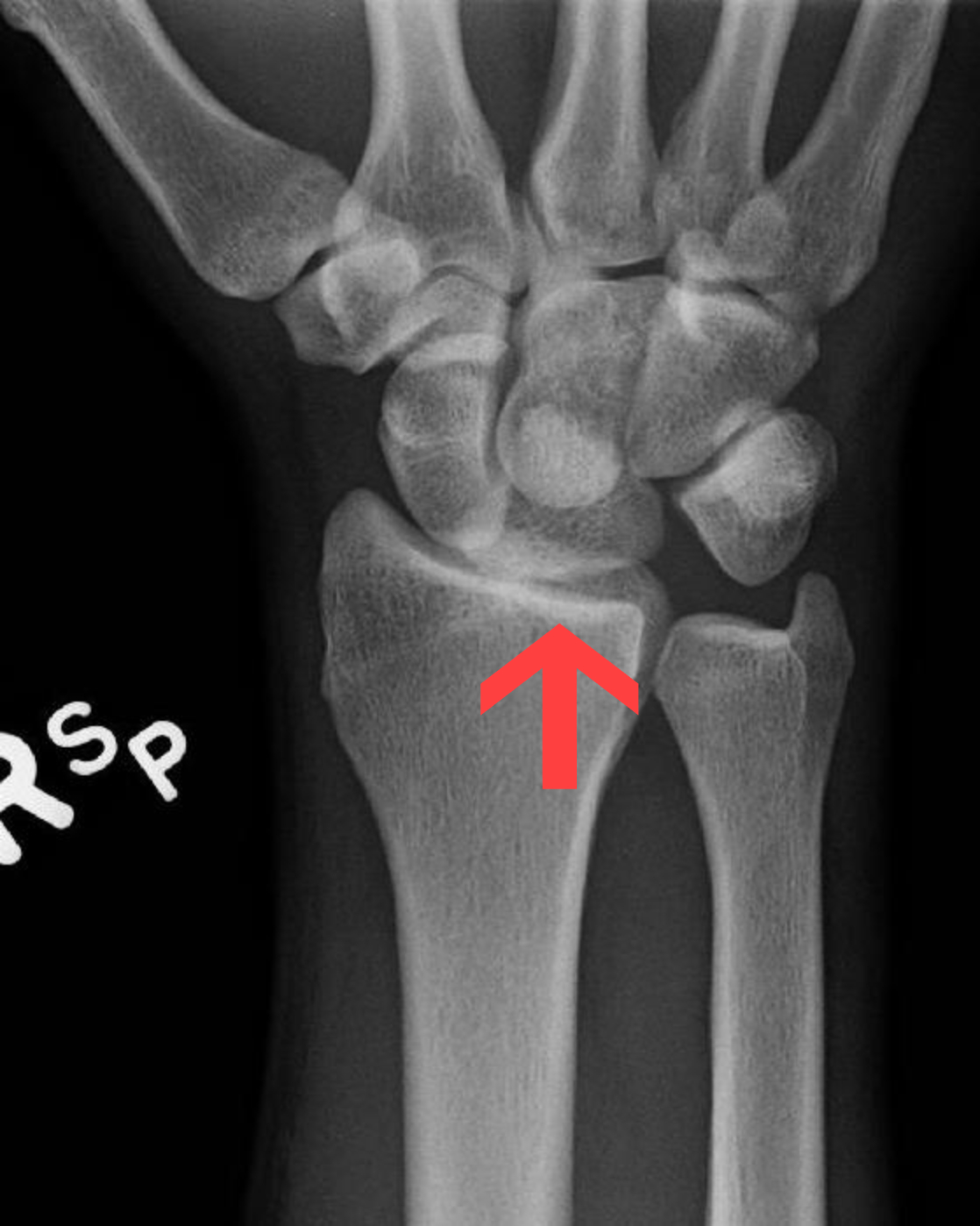
Dislocated lunate

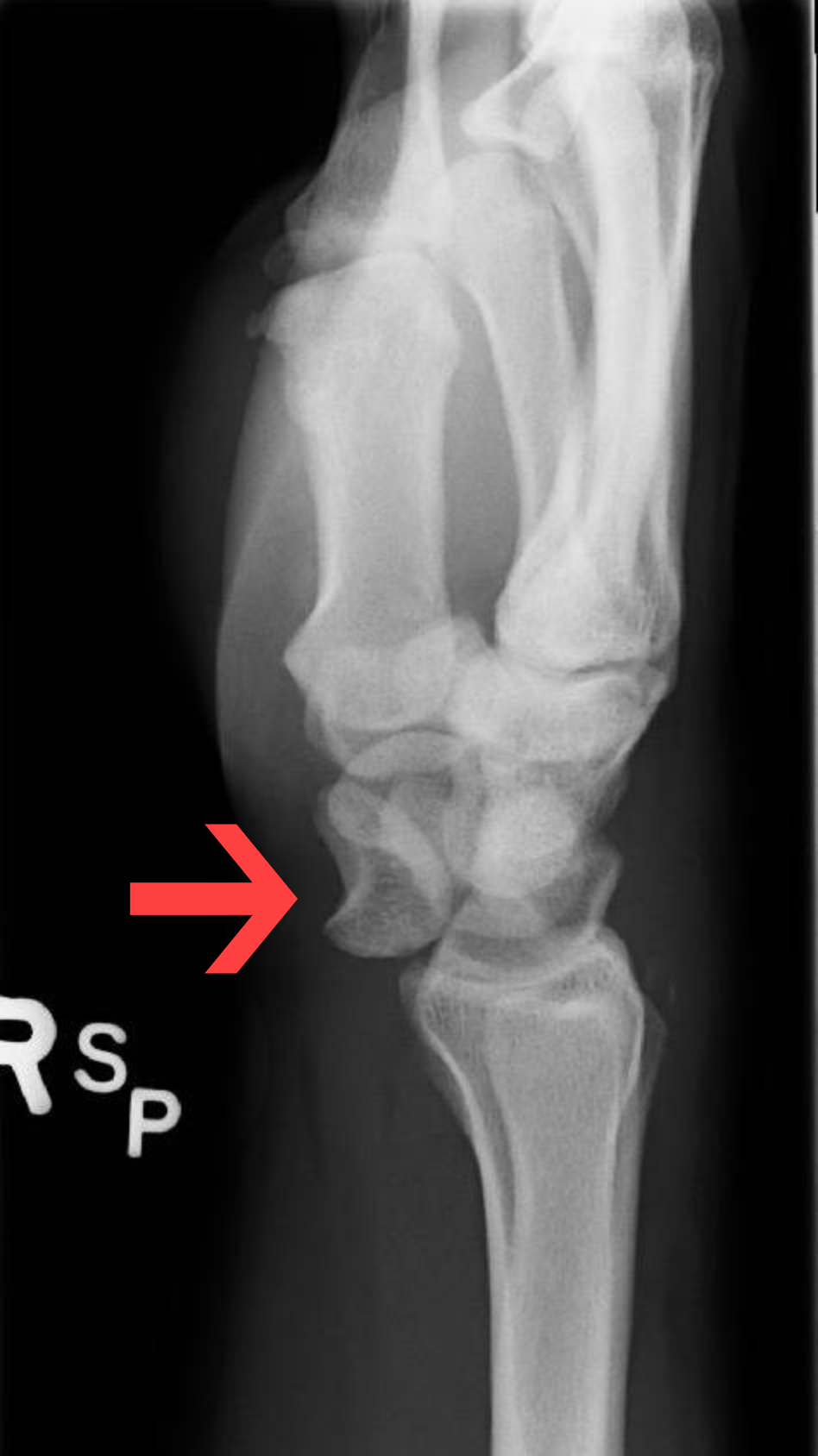
Dislocated lunate

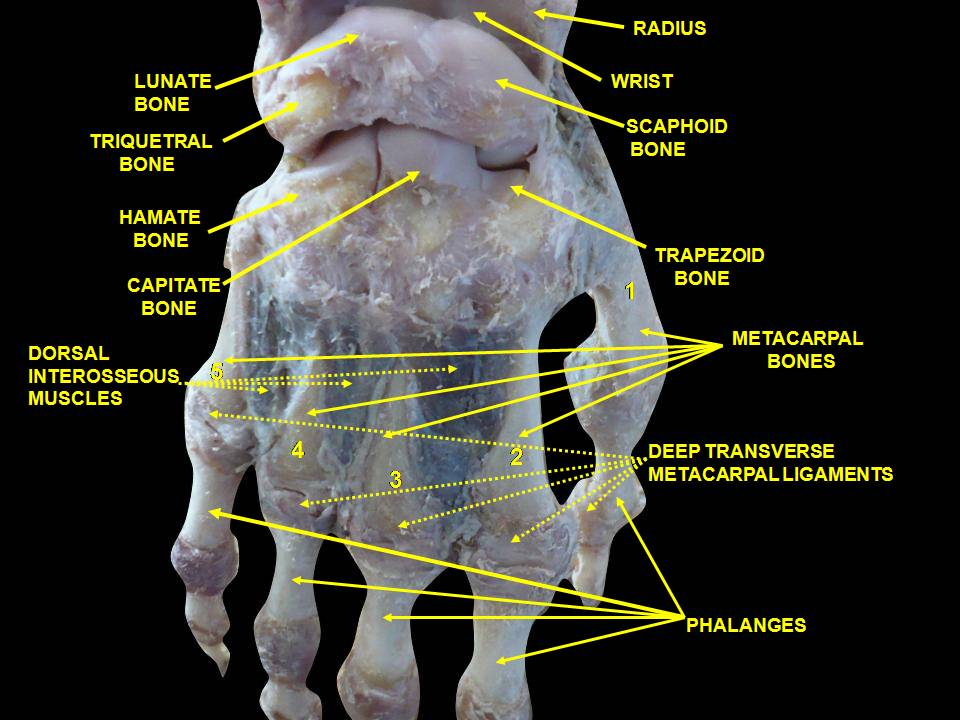
Wrist joint. Deep dissection. Posterior view.

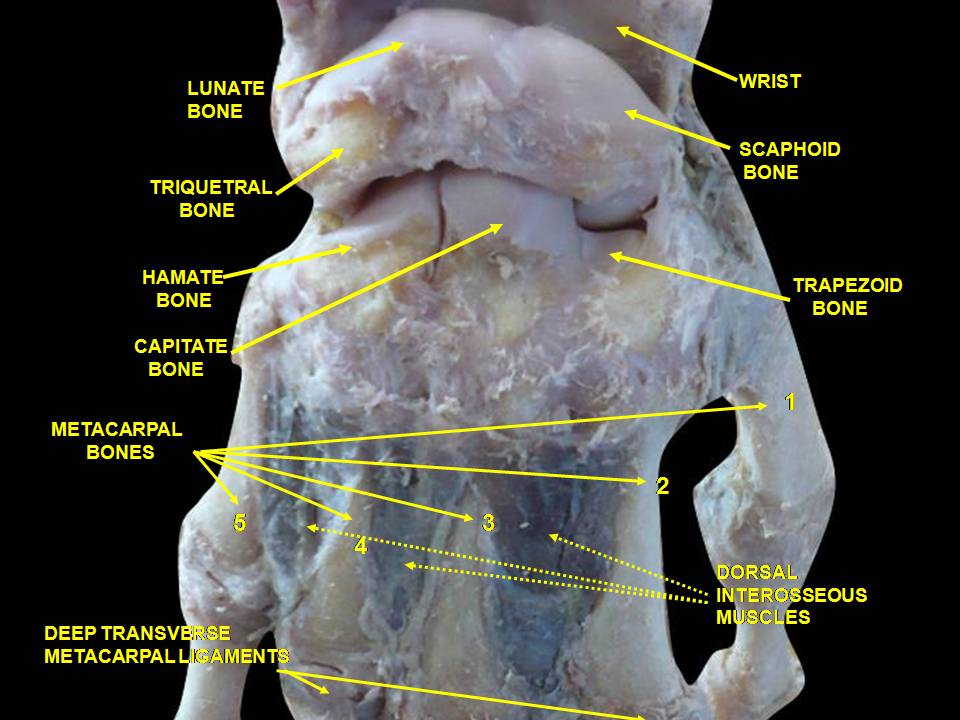
Wrist joint. Deep dissection. Posterior view.

== See also ==
- Carpal bone
